= List of Trichocolletes species =

This is a list of species in the bee genus Trichocolletes:

== Species ==
- Trichocolletes aeratus Batley & Houston, 2012
- Trichocolletes albigenae Batley & Houston, 2012
- Trichocolletes aureotinctus (Cockerell, 1906)
- Trichocolletes avialis Batley & Houston, 2012
- Trichocolletes brachytomus Batley & Houston, 2012
- Trichocolletes brunilabrum Batley & Houston, 2012
- Trichocolletes burnsi Michener, 1965
- Trichocolletes capillosus Batley & Houston, 2012
- Trichocolletes centralis Batley & Houston, 2012
- Trichocolletes chrysostomus (Cockerell, 1929)
- Trichocolletes dives (Cockerell, 1914)
- Trichocolletes dowerinensis Rayment, 1931
- Trichocolletes dundasensis Batley & Houston, 2012
- Trichocolletes eremophilae Houston, 1990
- Trichocolletes erythrurus (Cockerell, 1914)
- Trichocolletes fuscus Batley & Houston, 2012
- Trichocolletes gelasinus Batley & Houston, 2012
- Trichocolletes grandis Batley & Houston, 2012
- Trichocolletes hackeri (Cockerell, 1913)
- Trichocolletes lacaris Batley & Houston, 2012
- Trichocolletes latifrons (Cockerell, 1914)
- Trichocolletes leucogenys Batley & Houston, 2012
- Trichocolletes luteorufus Batley & Houston, 2012
- Trichocolletes macrognathus Batley & Houston, 2012
- Trichocolletes marginatus (Smith, 1879)
- Trichocolletes maximus (Cockerell, 1929)
- Trichocolletes micans Batley & Houston, 2012
- Trichocolletes multipectinatus Houston, 1990
- Trichocolletes nitens Batley & Houston, 2012
- Trichocolletes orientalis Batley & Houston, 2012
- Trichocolletes platyprosopis Batley & Houston, 2012
- Trichocolletes pulcherrimus Michener, 1965
- Trichocolletes rufibasis (Cockerell, 1929)
- Trichocolletes sericeus (Smith, 1862)
- Trichocolletes serotinus Batley & Houston, 2012
- Trichocolletes simus Batley & Houston, 2012
- Trichocolletes soror Batley & Houston, 2012
- Trichocolletes tenuiculus Rayment, 1931
- Trichocolletes tuberatus Batley & Houston, 2012
- Trichocolletes venustus (Smith, 1862)
