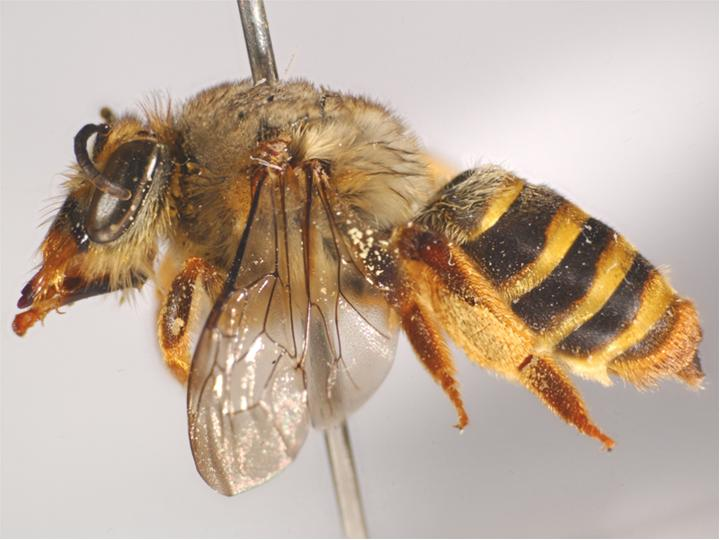
- Female

Scientific classification
- Kingdom: Animalia
- Phylum: Arthropoda
- Clade: Pancrustacea
- Class: Insecta
- Order: Hymenoptera
- Family: Colletidae
- Genus: Trichocolletes
- Species: T. dives

Binomial name
- Trichocolletes dives (Cockerell, 1914)

Synonyms
- Anthoglossa dives Cockerell, 1914

= Trichocolletes dives =

Species of bee

Trichocolletes dives is a species of bee in the family Colletidae and the subfamily Colletinae. It is endemic to Australia. It was described in 1914 by British-American entomologist Theodore Dru Alison Cockerell.

== Description ==
The body length is about 14 mm; the eyes are not hairy; the metasomal bands are wide and bright gold in colour.

== Distribution and habitat ==
The species occurs in southern coastal Western Australia. The type locality is Yallingup.

== Behaviour ==
The adults are flying mellivores. Flowering plants visited by the bees include Daviesia divaricata, Daviesia physodes, Daviesia triflora and Jacksonia hakeoides.

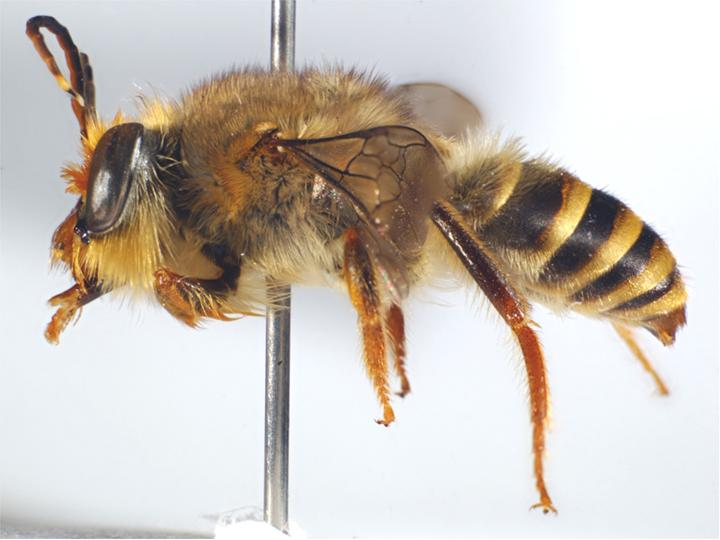
Male
