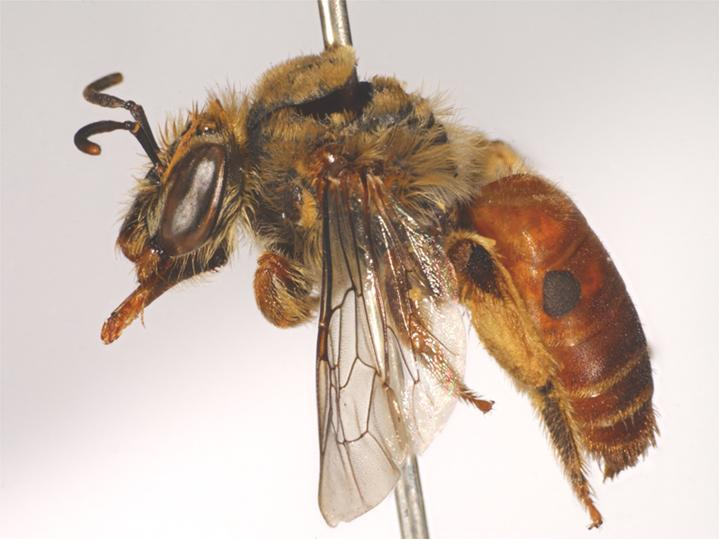
- Female

Scientific classification
- Kingdom: Animalia
- Phylum: Arthropoda
- Clade: Pancrustacea
- Class: Insecta
- Order: Hymenoptera
- Family: Colletidae
- Genus: Trichocolletes
- Species: T. soror

Binomial name
- Trichocolletes soror Batley & Houston, 2012

= Trichocolletes soror =

Species of bee

Trichocolletes soror is a species of bee in the family Colletidae and the subfamily Colletinae. It is endemic to Australia. It was described in 2012 by Australian entomologists Michael Batley and Terry Houston.

== Etymology ==
The specific epithet soror (Latin: 'sister') refers to the similarity between this species and Trichocolletes rufibasis.

== Description ==
The body length is about 12–14 mm. The eyes are not hairy. Colouration is mainly black and red-brown to orange, with gold metasomal bands, and with orange hair.

== Distribution and habitat ==
The species occurs in coastal Western Australia near Geraldton. The type locality is East Yuna Reserve, 34 km west-north-west of Mullewa.

== Behaviour ==
The adults are flying mellivores. Flowering plants visited by the bees include Chorizema racemosum, Comesperma scoparium, Jacksonia velutina, Mirbelia ramulosa, Mirbelia spinosa and Dampiera species.

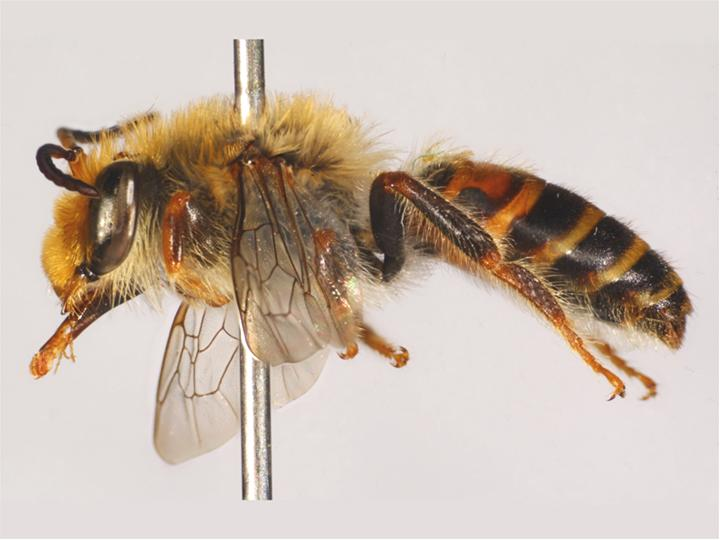
Male
