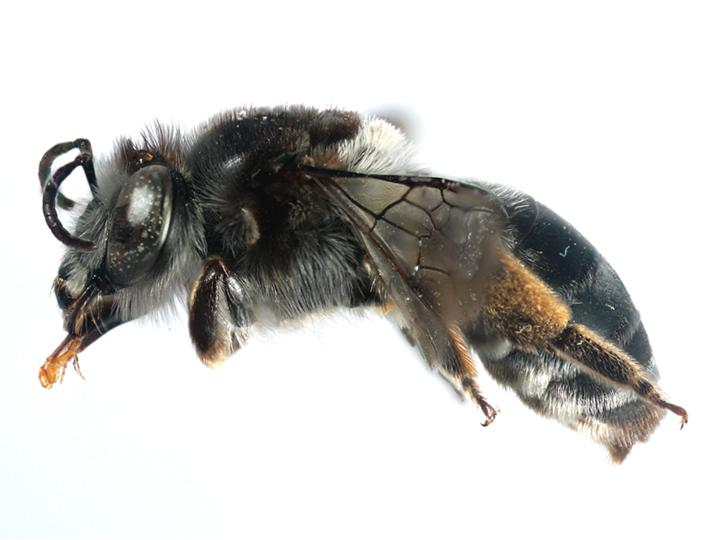
- Female

Scientific classification
- Kingdom: Animalia
- Phylum: Arthropoda
- Clade: Pancrustacea
- Class: Insecta
- Order: Hymenoptera
- Family: Colletidae
- Genus: Trichocolletes
- Species: T. latifrons

Binomial name
- Trichocolletes latifrons (Cockerell, 1914)

Synonyms
- Paracolletes latifrons Cockerell, 1914

= Trichocolletes latifrons =

Species of bee

Trichocolletes latifrons is a species of bee in the family Colletidae and the subfamily Colletinae. It is endemic to Australia. It was described in 1914 by British-American entomologist Theodore Dru Alison Cockerell.

== Description ==
The body length is 12–13 mm; the eyes are not hairy; the metasomal bands are indistinct.

== Distribution and habitat ==
The species occurs in coastal areas of south-eastern Queensland and north-eastern New South Wales. The type locality is Coolangatta.

== Behaviour ==
The adults are flying mellivores. Flowering plants visited by the bees include Gompholobium virgatum.

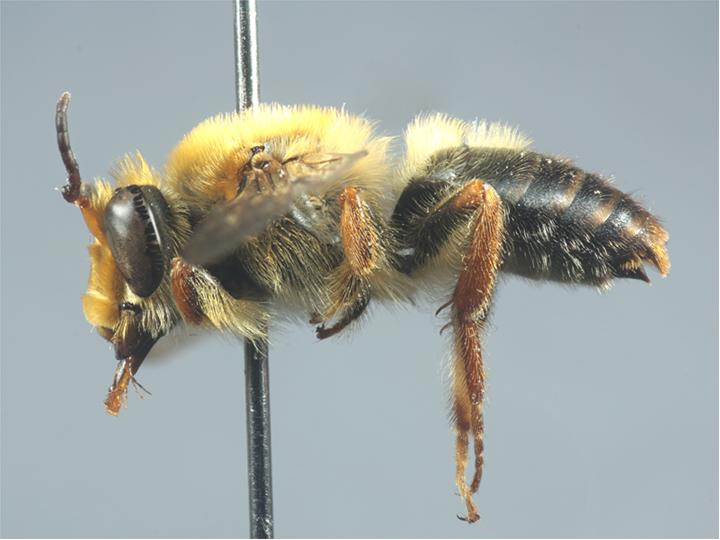
Male
