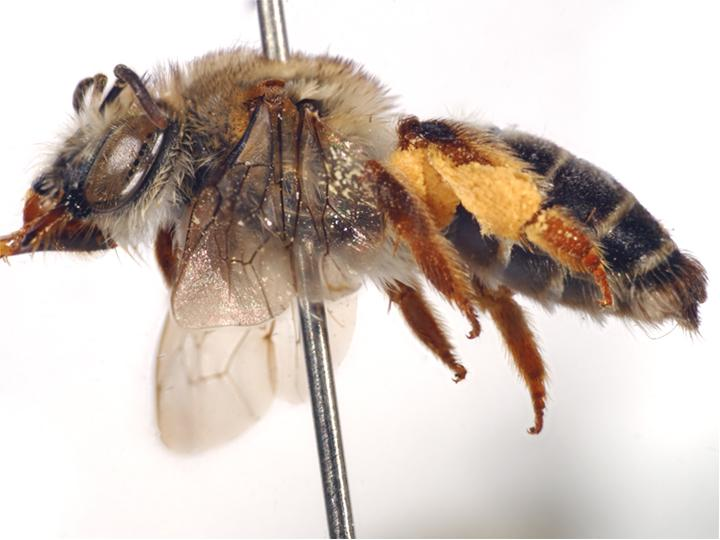
- Female

Scientific classification
- Kingdom: Animalia
- Phylum: Arthropoda
- Clade: Pancrustacea
- Class: Insecta
- Order: Hymenoptera
- Family: Colletidae
- Genus: Trichocolletes
- Species: T. dundasensis

Binomial name
- Trichocolletes dundasensis Batley & Houston, 2012

= Trichocolletes dundasensis =

Species of bee

Trichocolletes dundasensis is a species of bee in the family Colletidae and the subfamily Colletinae. It is endemic to Australia. It was described in 2012 by Australian entomologists Michael Batley and Terry Houston.

== Etymology ==
The specific epithet dundasensis refers to Dundas, an abandoned gold rush town near one of the collection sites.

== Description ==
The female body length is about 12 mm. The eyes are hairy. Colouration is mainly black and orange-brown, with narrow silver metasomal bands and pale orange-brown hair.

== Distribution and habitat ==
The species occurs mainly in inland south-western Australia. The type locality is some 6 km south-west of McDermid Rock, near Norseman, Western Australia.

== Behaviour ==
The adults are flying mellivores. Flowering plants visited by the bees include Daviesia aphylla, Daviesia benthamii and Daviesia brevifolia, as well as Gastrolobium species.

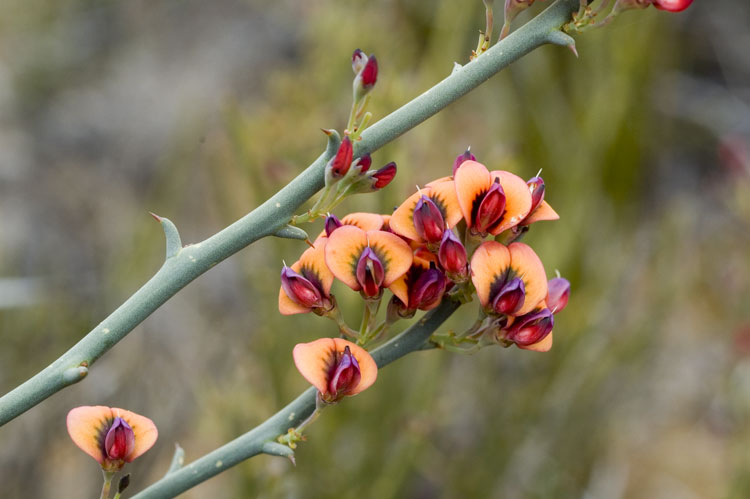
Flowers of Daviesia aphylla (spiny bitter-pea) a forage plant of the bees
