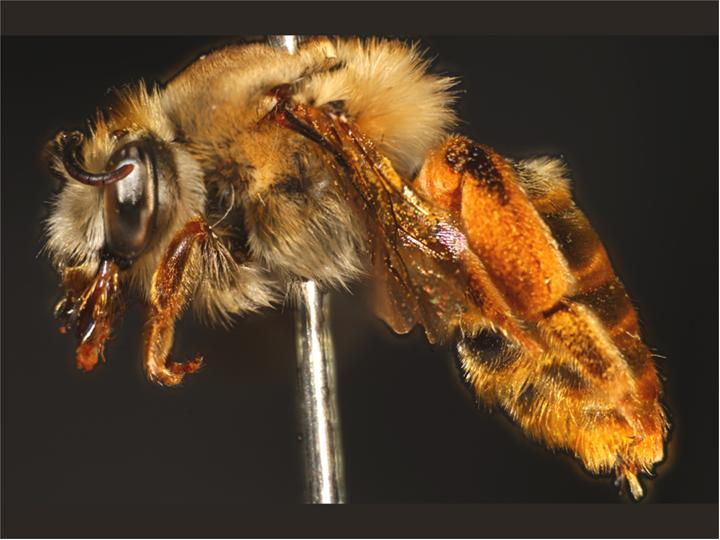
- Female

Scientific classification
- Kingdom: Animalia
- Phylum: Arthropoda
- Clade: Pancrustacea
- Class: Insecta
- Order: Hymenoptera
- Family: Colletidae
- Genus: Trichocolletes
- Species: T. luteorufus

Binomial name
- Trichocolletes luteorufus Batley & Houston, 2012

= Trichocolletes luteorufus =

Species of bee

Trichocolletes luteorufus is a species of bee in the family Colletidae and the subfamily Colletinae. It is endemic to Australia. It was described in 2012 by Australian entomologists Michael Batley and Terry Houston.

== Etymology ==
The specific epithet luteorufus (Latin: 'orange-red') refers to the bright orange colour of the female metasoma.

== Description ==
The body length of the female holotype is 15.2 mm. The eyes are not hairy. Colouration is mainly black, brown and orange, with broad gold metasomal bands, and with orange hair.

== Distribution and habitat ==
The species occurs in arid inland Western Australia in the vicinity of Mount Magnet. The type locality is 13 km north-east of Warriedar.

== Behaviour ==
The adults are flying mellivores. Flowering plants visited by the bees include Senna glutinosa and Ptilotus obovatus.
