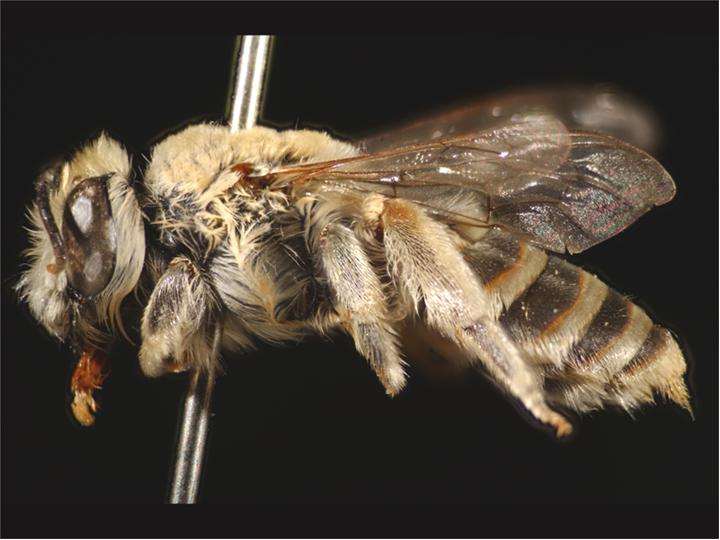
- Female

Scientific classification
- Kingdom: Animalia
- Phylum: Arthropoda
- Clade: Pancrustacea
- Class: Insecta
- Order: Hymenoptera
- Family: Colletidae
- Genus: Trichocolletes
- Species: T. lacaris

Binomial name
- Trichocolletes lacaris Batley & Houston, 2012

= Trichocolletes lacaris =

Species of bee

Trichocolletes lacaris is a species of bee in the family Colletidae and the subfamily Colletinae. It is endemic to Australia. It was described in 2012 by Australian entomologists Michael Batley and Terry Houston.

== Etymology ==
The specific epithet lacaris (Latin: 'of a lake') refers to several collection sites.

== Description ==
The body length is about 12–13 mm. The eyes are hairy. Colouration is mainly black and dark-brown to orange-brown, with white and orange hair. The bees have broad silver metasomal bands.

== Distribution and habitat ==
The species occurs in arid areas of South Australia and coastal Western Australia north of Shark Bay. The type locality is Lake Callabonna. Other published localities include the usually dry lakes Puntawolona, Ngapakaldi and Palankarinna, as well as Kendrew Island in the Dampier Archipelago.

== Behaviour ==
The adults are flying mellivores. Flowering plants visited by the bees include Swainsona pterostylis.

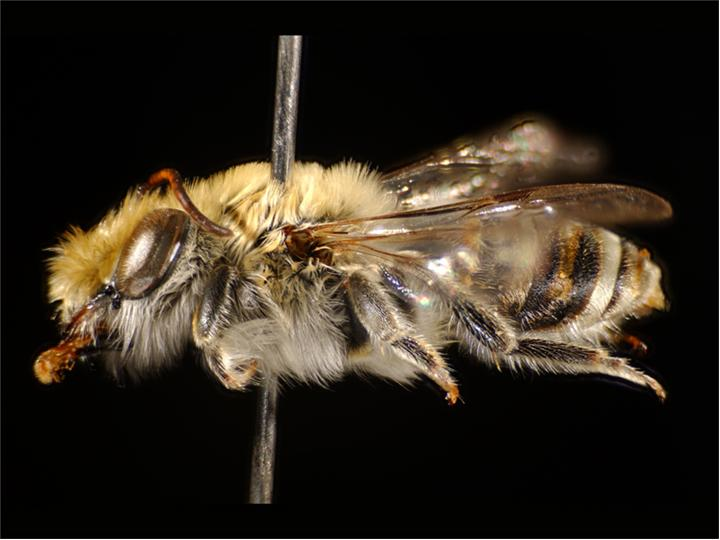
Male
