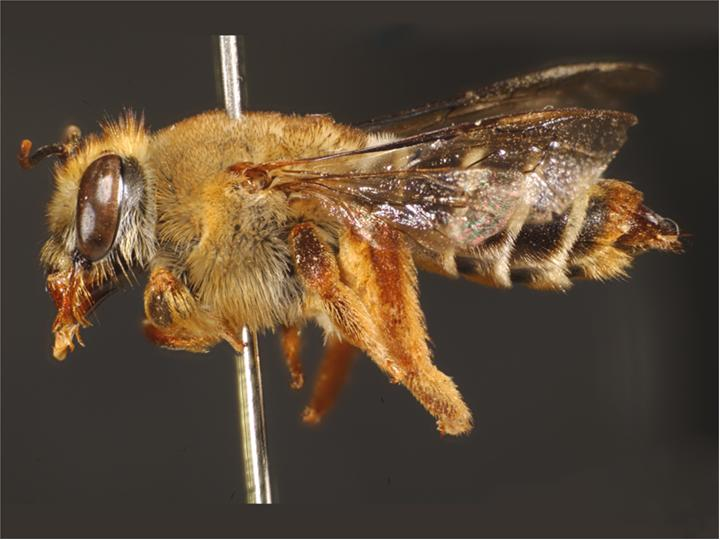
- Female

Scientific classification
- Kingdom: Animalia
- Phylum: Arthropoda
- Clade: Pancrustacea
- Class: Insecta
- Order: Hymenoptera
- Family: Colletidae
- Genus: Trichocolletes
- Species: T. gelasinus

Binomial name
- Trichocolletes gelasinus Batley & Houston, 2012

= Trichocolletes gelasinus =

Species of bee

Trichocolletes gelasinus is a species of bee in the family Colletidae and the subfamily Colletinae. It is endemic to Australia. It was described in 2012 by Australian entomologists Michael Batley and Terry Houston.

== Etymology ==
The specific epithet gelasinus (Latin: 'dimple') is an anatomical reference to the apex of the male flagellum.

== Description ==
The body length is about 13–14 mm. The eyes are not hairy. Colouration is mainly black and orange-brown, with broad white metasomal bands, and with orange and white hair.

== Distribution and habitat ==
The species occurs in coastal south-western Australia. The type locality is Neerabup National Park, 38 km north-north-west of Perth.

== Behaviour ==
The adults are flying mellivores. Flowering plants visited by the bees include Daviesia divaricata, Daviesia physodes, Daviesia quadrilatera and Hardenbergia comptoniana.

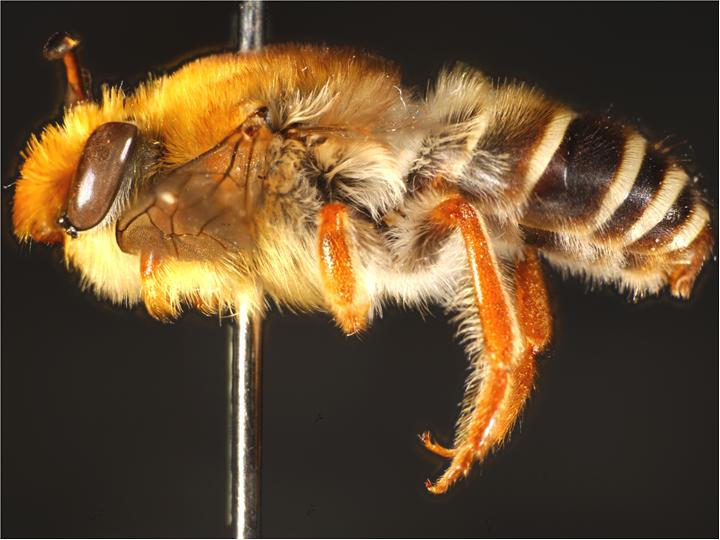
Male
