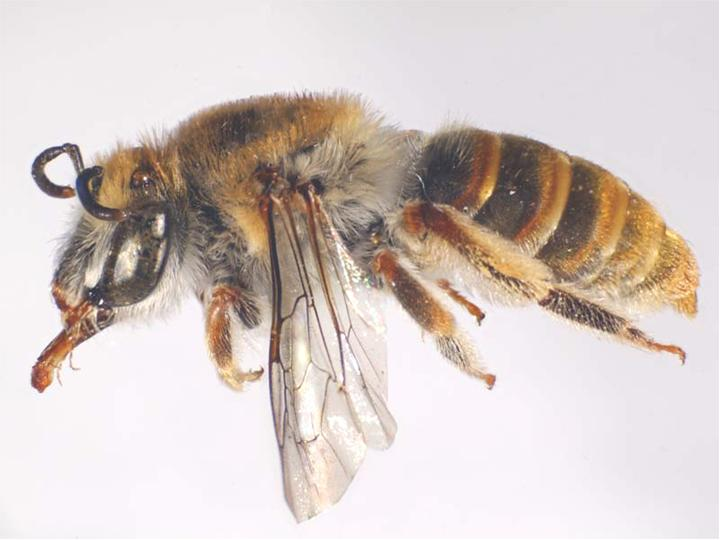
- Female

Scientific classification
- Kingdom: Animalia
- Phylum: Arthropoda
- Clade: Pancrustacea
- Class: Insecta
- Order: Hymenoptera
- Family: Colletidae
- Genus: Trichocolletes
- Species: T. aureotinctus

Binomial name
- Trichocolletes aureotinctus (Cockerell, 1906)

Synonyms
- Anthoglossa aureotincta Cockerell, 1906

= Trichocolletes aureotinctus =

Species of bee

Trichocolletes aureotinctus is a species of bee in the family Colletidae and the subfamily Colletinae. It is endemic to Australia. It was described in 1906 by British-American entomologist Theodore Dru Alison Cockerell.

== Distribution and habitat ==
The species occurs in Western Australia. The type locality is Perth.

== Behaviour ==
The adults are flying mellivores. Flowering plants visited by the bees include Enekbatus stowardii and Daviesia grahamii, as well as Kennedia, Swainsona and Dampiera species.

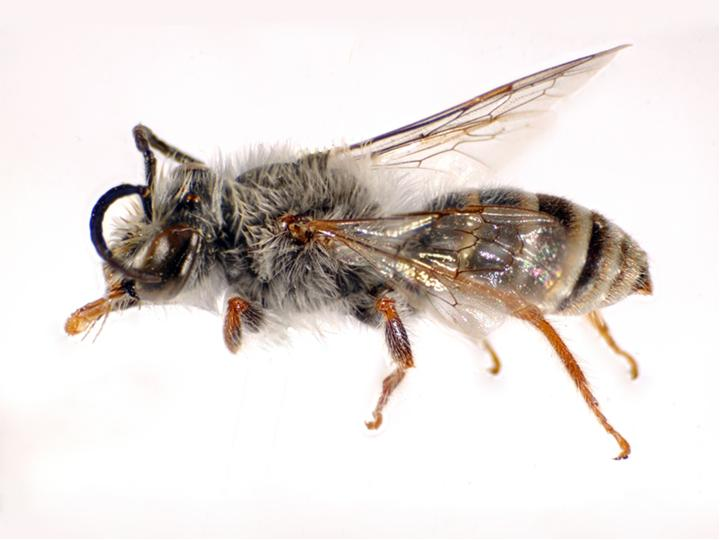
Male
