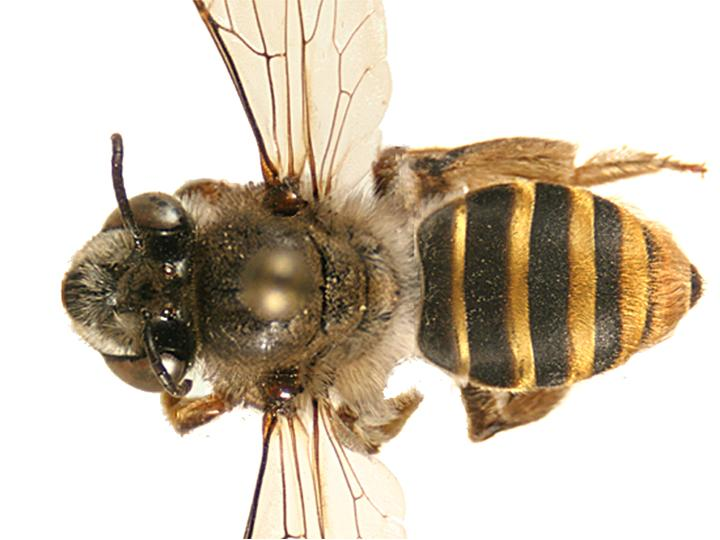
- Female

Scientific classification
- Kingdom: Animalia
- Phylum: Arthropoda
- Clade: Pancrustacea
- Class: Insecta
- Order: Hymenoptera
- Family: Colletidae
- Genus: Trichocolletes
- Species: T. nitens

Binomial name
- Trichocolletes nitens Batley & Houston, 2012

= Trichocolletes nitens =

Species of bee

Trichocolletes nitens is a species of bee in the family Colletidae and the subfamily Colletinae. It is endemic to Australia. It was described in 2012 by Australian entomologists Michael Batley and Terry Houston.

== Etymology ==
The specific epithet nitens (Latin: 'brilliant') refers to the conspicuous golden metasomal bands.

== Description ==
The body length is about 12–13 mm. The eyes are not hairy. Colouration is mainly black and dark brown to orange-brown, with broad orange-gold metasomal bands, and with gold, orange and white hair.

== Distribution and habitat ==
The species occurs in inland south-western and southern Western Australia. The type locality is about 6 km south-west of McDermid Rock, near Norseman.

== Behaviour ==
The adults are flying mellivores. Flowering plants visited by the bees include Daviesia aphylla, Leptospermum erubescens, and Gastrolobium ilicifolium.

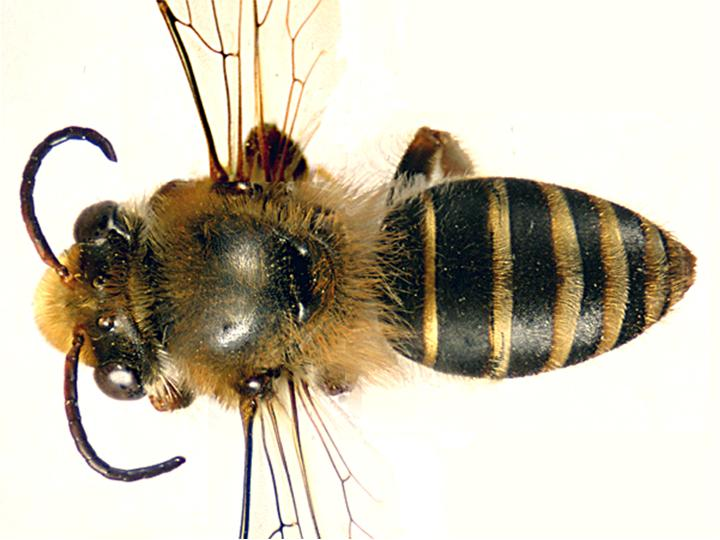
Male
