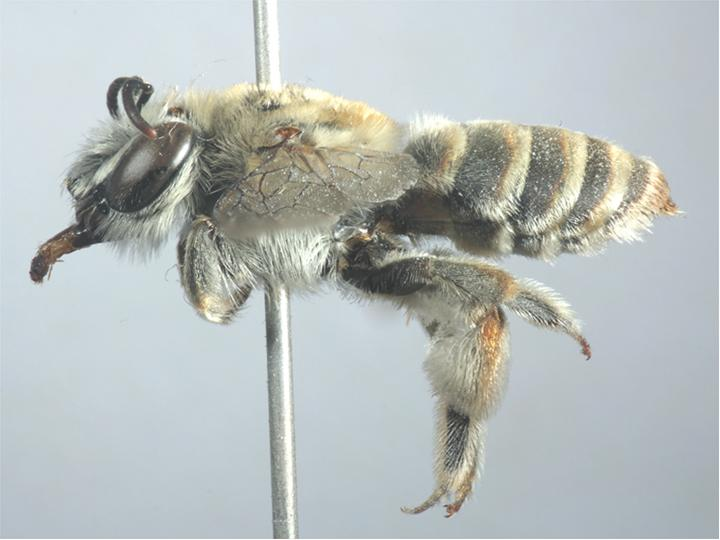
- Female

Scientific classification
- Kingdom: Animalia
- Phylum: Arthropoda
- Clade: Pancrustacea
- Class: Insecta
- Order: Hymenoptera
- Family: Colletidae
- Genus: Trichocolletes
- Species: T. micans

Binomial name
- Trichocolletes micans Batley & Houston, 2012

= Trichocolletes micans =

Species of bee

Trichocolletes micans is a species of bee in the family Colletidae and the subfamily Colletinae. It is endemic to Australia. It was described in 2012 by Australian entomologists Michael Batley and Terry Houston.

== Etymology ==
The specific epithet micans (Latin: 'glittering') refers to the glossy metasoma, which is conspicuous when the bees are foraging in direct sunlight.

== Description ==
The body length is about 11–12 mm. The eyes are hairy. Colouration is mainly black and brown, with white and pale brown hair. The bees have broad silver-white metasomal bands.

== Distribution and habitat ==
The species occurs in inland South Australia and New South Wales. The type locality is Kinchega National Park.

== Behaviour ==
The adults are flying mellivores. Flowering plants visited by the bees include Swainsona species.

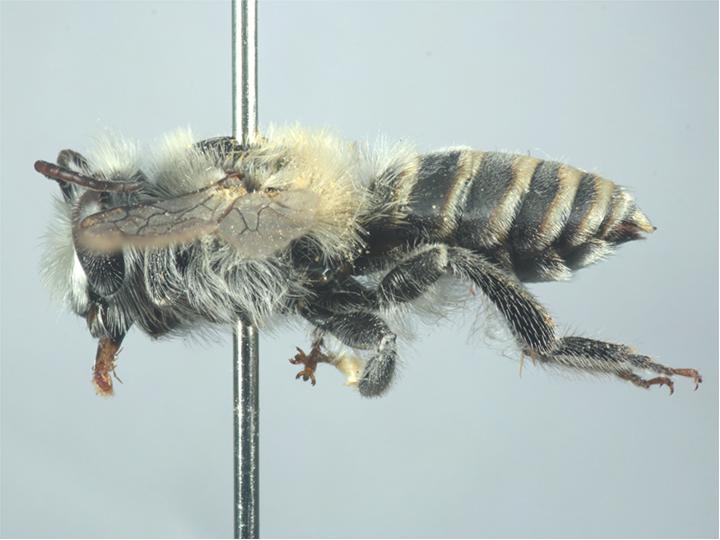
Male
