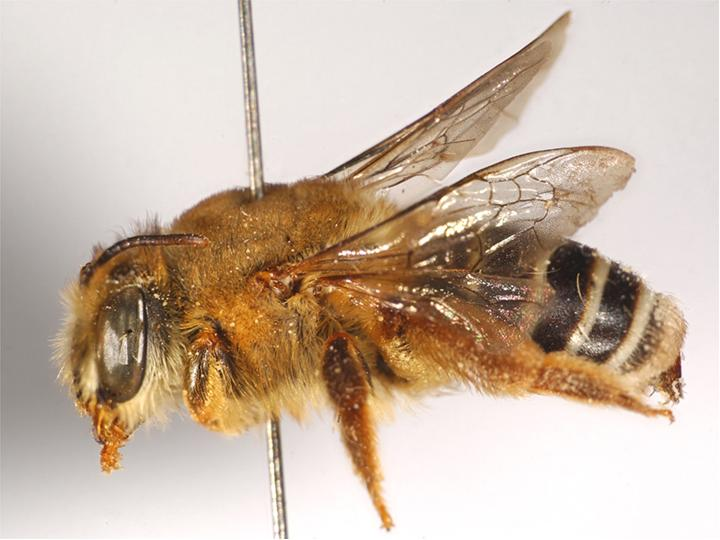
- Female

Scientific classification
- Kingdom: Animalia
- Phylum: Arthropoda
- Clade: Pancrustacea
- Class: Insecta
- Order: Hymenoptera
- Family: Colletidae
- Genus: Trichocolletes
- Species: T. simus

Binomial name
- Trichocolletes simus Batley & Houston, 2012

= Trichocolletes simus =

Species of bee

Trichocolletes simus is a species of bee in the family Colletidae and the subfamily Colletinae. It is endemic to Australia. It was described in 2012 by Australian entomologists Michael Batley and Terry Houston.

== Etymology ==
The specific epithet simus (Latin: 'flat-nosed' or 'snub-nosed') is an anatomical reference.

== Description ==
The body length is about 11–12 mm. The eyes are not hairy. Colouration is mainly black and red-brown to orange-brown, with white metasomal bands, and with orange hair.

== Distribution and habitat ==
The species occurs in the Geraldton Sandplains bioregion of Western Australia. The type locality is Eneabba.

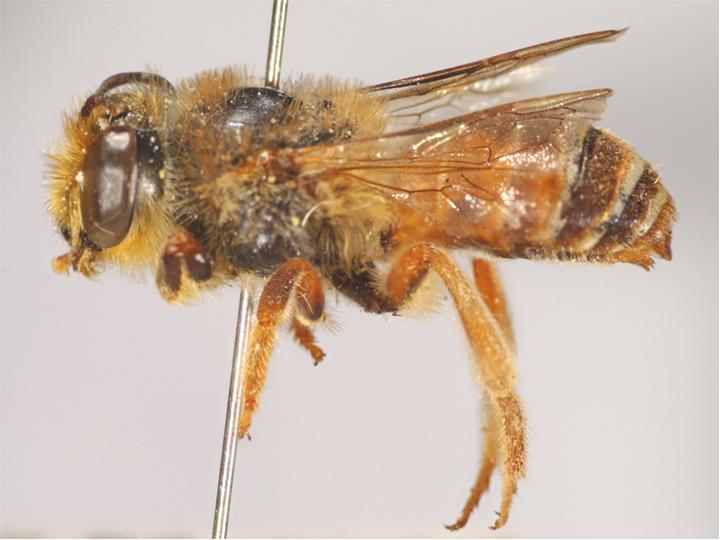
Male

== Behaviour ==
The adults are flying mellivores. Flowering plants visited by the bees include Daviesia species.
