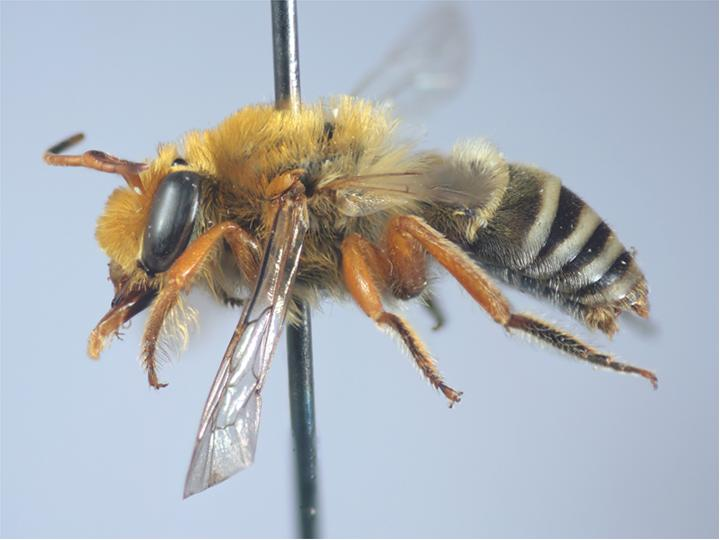
- Male

Scientific classification
- Kingdom: Animalia
- Phylum: Arthropoda
- Clade: Pancrustacea
- Class: Insecta
- Order: Hymenoptera
- Family: Colletidae
- Genus: Trichocolletes
- Species: T. avialis

Binomial name
- Trichocolletes avialis Batley & Houston, 2012

= Trichocolletes avialis =

Species of bee

Trichocolletes avialis is a species of bee in the family Colletidae and the subfamily Colletinae. It is endemic to Australia. It was described in 2012 by Australian entomologists Michael Batley and Terry Houston.

== Etymology ==
The specific epithet avialis (Latin: 'out-of-the-way') refers to the remote collection sites of the two male type specimens.

== Description ==
The male holotype body length is 12.6 mm. The eyes are not hairy. Colouration is mainly black and dark brown to orange-brown, with white markings, broad silver metasomal bands, and orange hair.

== Distribution and habitat ==
The species occurs in arid areas of northern Australia. The type locality is 20 m east of Mount Madley, in the Kata Kata Hills, on the edge of the Little Sandy and Gibson Deserts, in Western Australia. A paratype male was also collected at 41 Mile Bore in the Northern Territory.

== Behaviour ==
The adults are flying mellivores.
