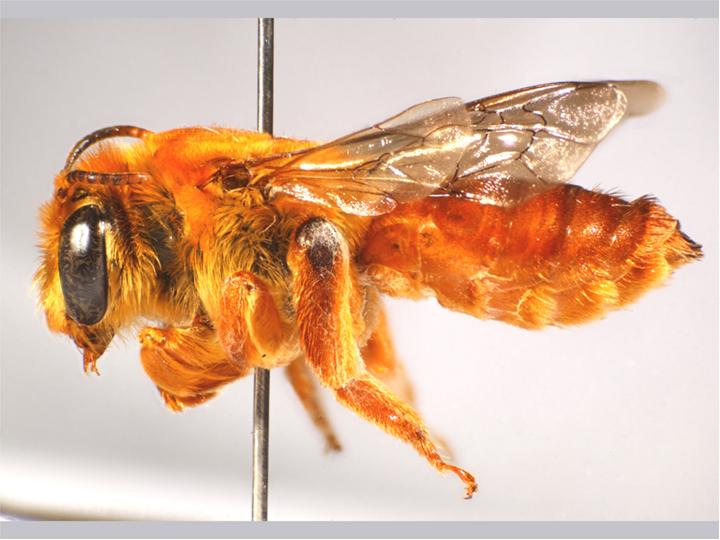
- Female

Scientific classification
- Kingdom: Animalia
- Phylum: Arthropoda
- Clade: Pancrustacea
- Class: Insecta
- Order: Hymenoptera
- Family: Colletidae
- Genus: Trichocolletes
- Species: T. pulcherrimus

Binomial name
- Trichocolletes pulcherrimus Michener, 1965

= Trichocolletes pulcherrimus =

Species of bee

Trichocolletes pulcherrimus is a species of bee in the family Colletidae and the subfamily Colletinae. It is endemic to Australia. It was described in 1965 by American entomologist Charles Duncan Michener.

== Description ==
The body length is 16–18 mm. The eyes are hairy. Colouration is mainly black; the metasoma is orange-brown with indistinct bands.

== Distribution and habitat ==
The species occurs in south-west Western Australia. The type locality is Narrogin in the Wheatbelt.

== Behaviour ==
The adults are flying mellivores. Flowering plants visited by the bees include Gompholobium hendersonii, Gastrolobium spinosum, Gastrolobium viscidulum and Jacksonia species.

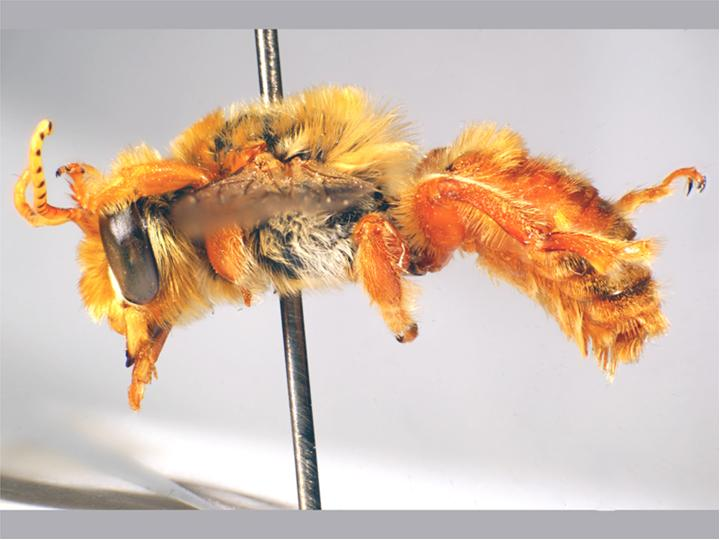
Male
