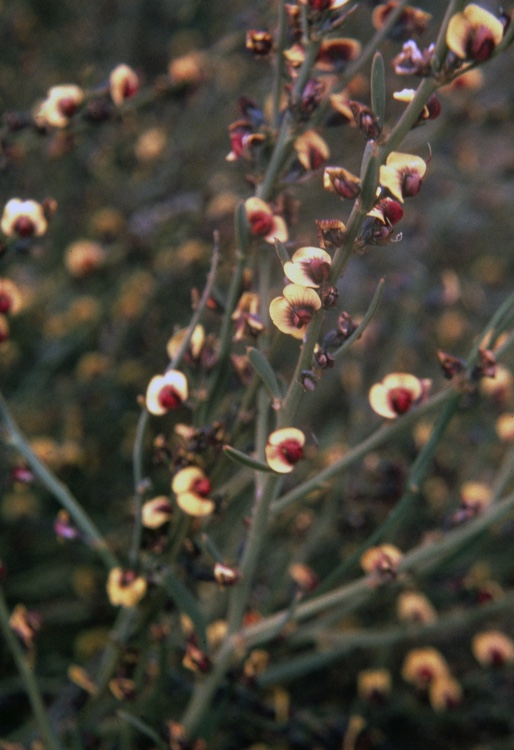
- Near Mullewa

Scientific classification
- Kingdom: Plantae
- Clade: Tracheophytes
- Clade: Angiosperms
- Clade: Eudicots
- Clade: Rosids
- Order: Fabales
- Family: Fabaceae
- Subfamily: Faboideae
- Genus: Daviesia
- Species: D. grahamii

Binomial name
- Daviesia grahamii Ewart & Jean White

= Daviesia grahamii =

Species of flowering plant

Daviesia grahamii is a species of flowering plant in the family Fabaceae and is endemic to the interior of Western Australia. It is a multi-stemmed shrub with narrowly egg-shaped to linear phyllodes, and bright yellow to orange-yellow, dark red and maroon flowers.

== Description ==
Daviesia grahamii is a multi-stemmed shrub that typically grows to a height of 20–50 cm (7.9–19.7 in) high, up to 1 m (3 ft 3 in) and has tangled branches. Its phyllodes are scattered, narrowly egg-shaped with the narrower end towards the base, to linear, usually up to 50 mm (2.0 in) long and 3 mm (0.12 in) wide with a hard, but not sharply-pointed tip. The flowers are arranged in up to four groups of one or two on a peduncle 0.8–2.5 mm (0.031–0.098 in) long, each flower on a pedicel 1.4–3.2 mm (0.055–0.126 in) long with bracts about 1.5 mm (0.059 in) long at the base. The sepals are 3.0–3.5 mm (0.12–0.14 in) long and joined at the base, the upper two with lobes up to 1.5 mm (0.059 in) long and the lower three 0.5–1 mm (0.020–0.039 in) long. The standard petal is bright yellow to orange-yellow, 7–8 mm (0.28–0.31 in) long with a dark red base, the wings about 6–7 mm (0.24–0.28 in) long and dark red with yellow-orange tips, and the keel is 5–6 mm (0.20–0.24 in) long and maroon. Flowering occurs from July to October and the fruit is a flattened triangular pod 6–8 mm (0.24–0.31 in) long.

== Taxonomy and naming ==
Daviesia grahamii was first formally described in 1984 by Alfred James Ewart and Jean White-Haney in the Proceedings of the Royal Society of Victoria from specimens collected by Max Koch in 1905. The specific epithet (grahamii) honours George Graham, Minister for Agriculture.

== Distribution and habitat ==
This daviesia grows in spinifex hummock-grassland in arid areas of Western Australia between the Little Sandy Desert and the eastern edge of the wheatbelt.

== Conservation status ==
Daviesia grahamii is listed as "not threatened" by the Department of Biodiversity, Conservation and Attractions.
