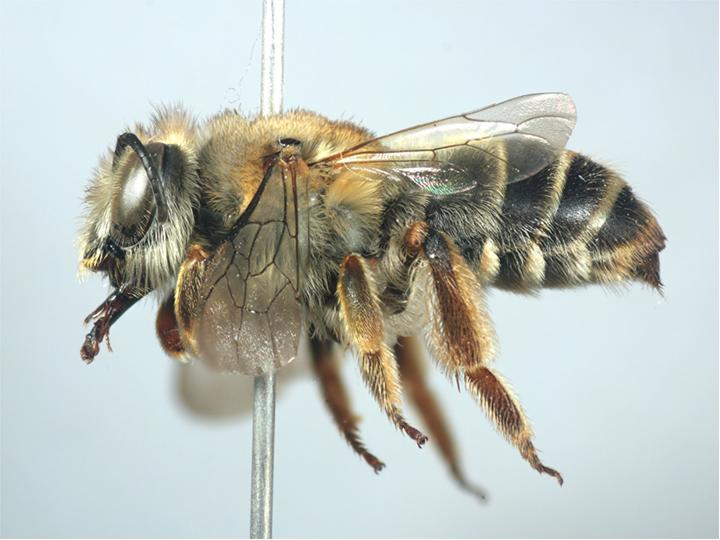
- Female

Scientific classification
- Kingdom: Animalia
- Phylum: Arthropoda
- Clade: Pancrustacea
- Class: Insecta
- Order: Hymenoptera
- Family: Colletidae
- Genus: Trichocolletes
- Species: T. tenuiculus

Binomial name
- Trichocolletes tenuiculus Rayment, 1931

= Trichocolletes tenuiculus =

Species of bee

Trichocolletes tenuiculus is a species of bee in the family Colletidae and the subfamily Colletinae. It is endemic to Australia. It was described in 1931 by Australian entomologist Tarlton Rayment.

== Description ==
The body length is about 13 mm. The eyes are hairy. Colouration is mainly black, with narrow, brown-edged, silver metasomal bands.

== Distribution and habitat ==
The species occurs in eastern Australia on the tablelands and slopes of New South Wales.

== Behaviour ==
The adults are flying mellivores. Flowering plants visited by the bees include Hardenbergia violacea and Daviesia species.

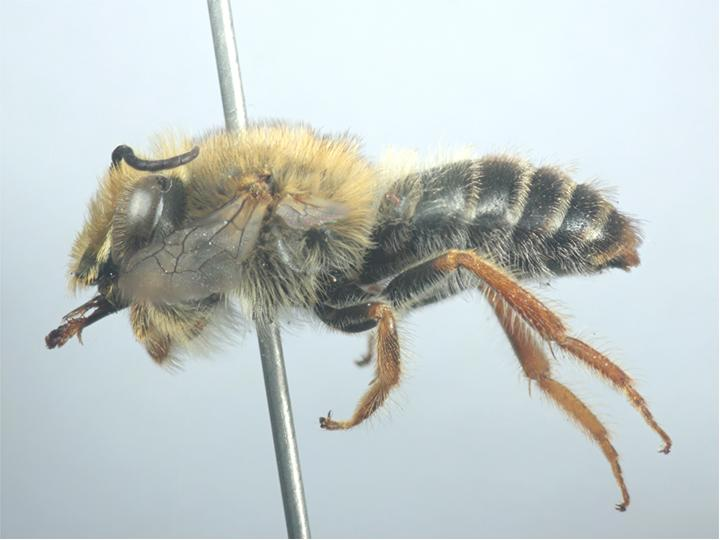
Male
