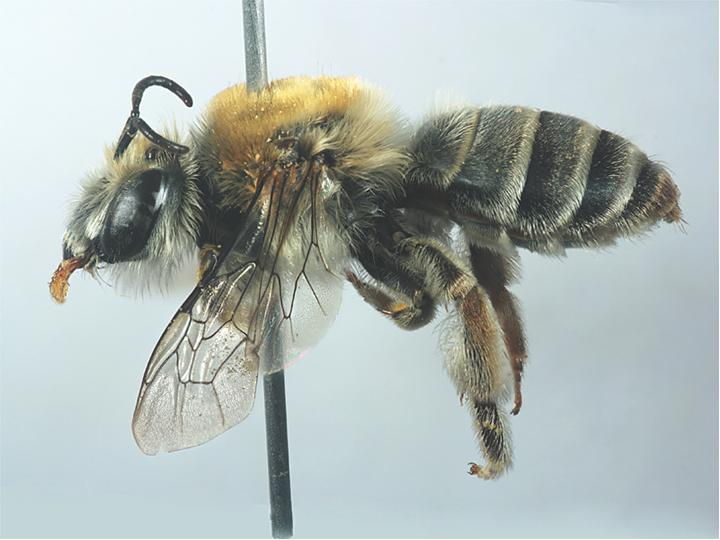
- Female

Scientific classification
- Kingdom: Animalia
- Phylum: Arthropoda
- Clade: Pancrustacea
- Class: Insecta
- Order: Hymenoptera
- Family: Colletidae
- Genus: Trichocolletes
- Species: T. grandis

Binomial name
- Trichocolletes grandis Batley & Houston, 2012

= Trichocolletes grandis =

Species of bee

Trichocolletes grandis is a species of bee in the family Colletidae and the subfamily Colletinae. It is endemic to Australia. It was described in 2012 by Australian entomologists Michael Batley and Terry Houston.

== Etymology ==
The specific epithet grandis refers to the species' relatively large size.

== Description ==
The body length is about 13–14 mm. The eyes are hairy. Colouration is mainly black, brown and amber, with white and orange hair. The bees have broad silver metasomal bands.

== Distribution and habitat ==
The species occurs in arid areas of South Australia and western New South Wales. The type locality is 50 km south-east of Broken Hill.

== Behaviour ==
The adults are flying mellivores. Flowering plants visited by the bees include Swainsona viridis and Swainsona purpurea.

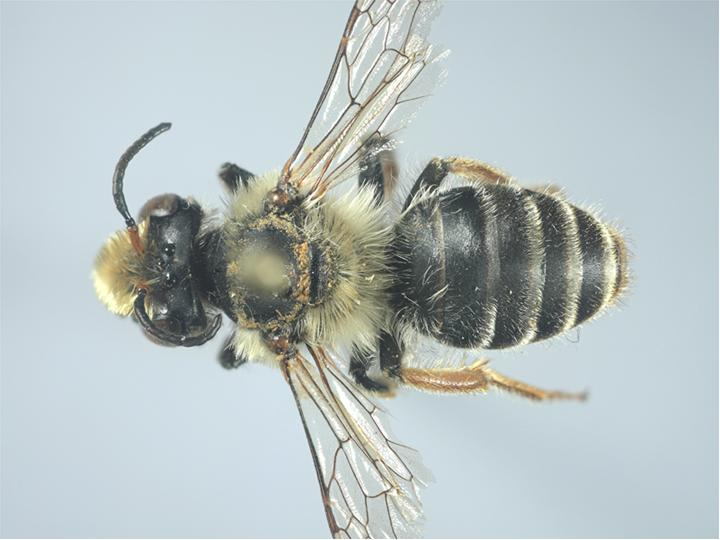
Male
