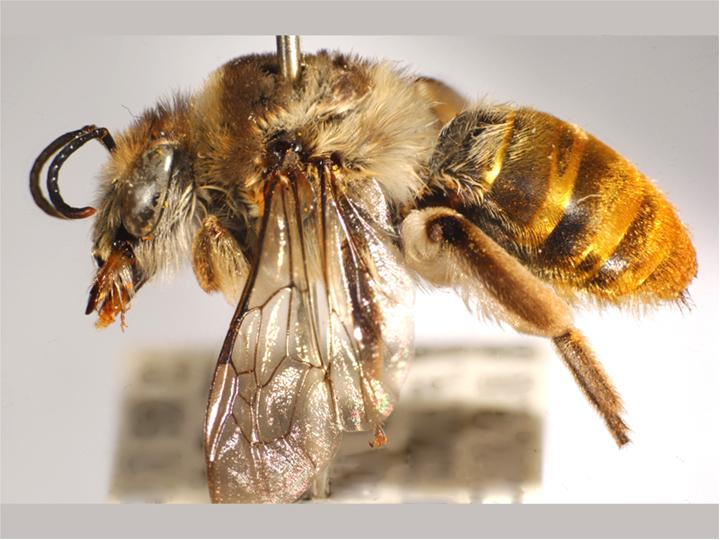
- Female

Scientific classification
- Kingdom: Animalia
- Phylum: Arthropoda
- Clade: Pancrustacea
- Class: Insecta
- Order: Hymenoptera
- Family: Colletidae
- Genus: Trichocolletes
- Species: T. macrognathus

Binomial name
- Trichocolletes macrognathus Batley & Houston, 2012

= Trichocolletes macrognathus =

Species of bee

Trichocolletes macrognathus is a species of bee in the family Colletidae and the subfamily Colletinae. It is endemic to Australia. It was described in 2012 by Australian entomologists Michael Batley and Terry Houston.

== Etymology ==
The specific epithet macrognathus (Greek: 'large jaw') is an anatomical reference.

== Description ==
The body length is about 12–14 mm. The eyes are not hairy. Colouration is mainly black and orange-brown, with broad gold metasomal bands, and with golden and white hair.

== Distribution and habitat ==
The species occurs around Geraldton in Western Australia. The type locality is 13 km south of Wanoo.

== Behaviour ==
The adults are flying mellivores. Flowering plants visited by the bees include Malleostemon roseus, Thryptomene hyporhytis, Prostanthera wilkieana and Baeckea species.

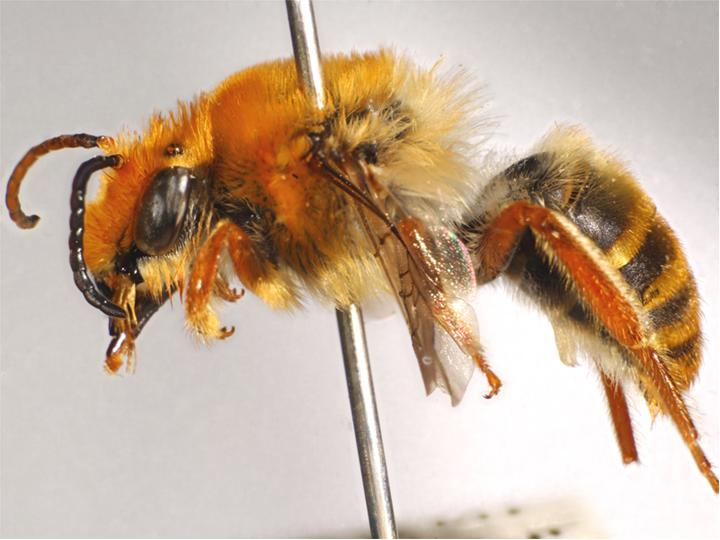
Male
