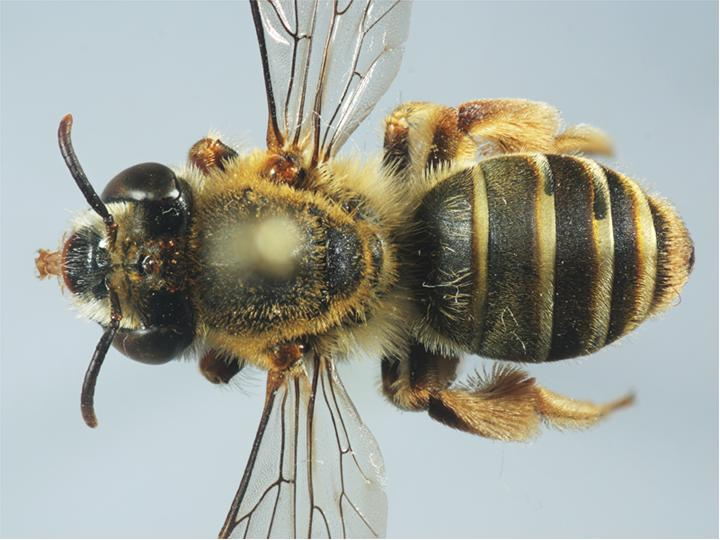
- Female

Scientific classification
- Kingdom: Animalia
- Phylum: Arthropoda
- Clade: Pancrustacea
- Class: Insecta
- Order: Hymenoptera
- Family: Colletidae
- Genus: Trichocolletes
- Species: T. sericeus

Binomial name
- Trichocolletes sericeus (Smith, 1862)

Synonyms
- Anthoglossa sericea Smith, 1862; Trichocolletes (Trichocolletes) marginatulus Michener, 1965

= Trichocolletes sericeus =

Species of bee

Trichocolletes sericeus is a species of bee in the family Colletidae and the subfamily Colletinae. It is endemic to Australia. It was described in 1862 by English entomologist Frederick Smith.

== Distribution and habitat ==
The species occurs in south-eastern Australia.

== Behaviour ==
The adults are flying mellivores. Flowering plants visited by the bees include Dillwynia floribunda, Podolobium ilicifolium, Daviesia alata, Daviesia acicularis and Leptospermum species.

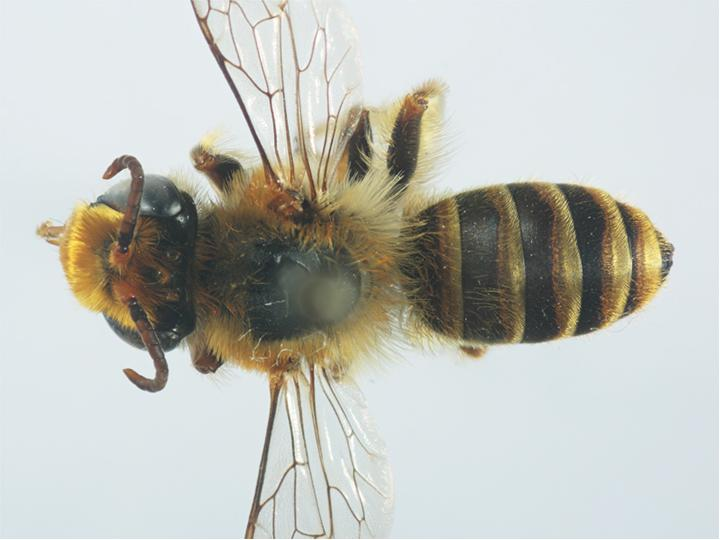
Male
