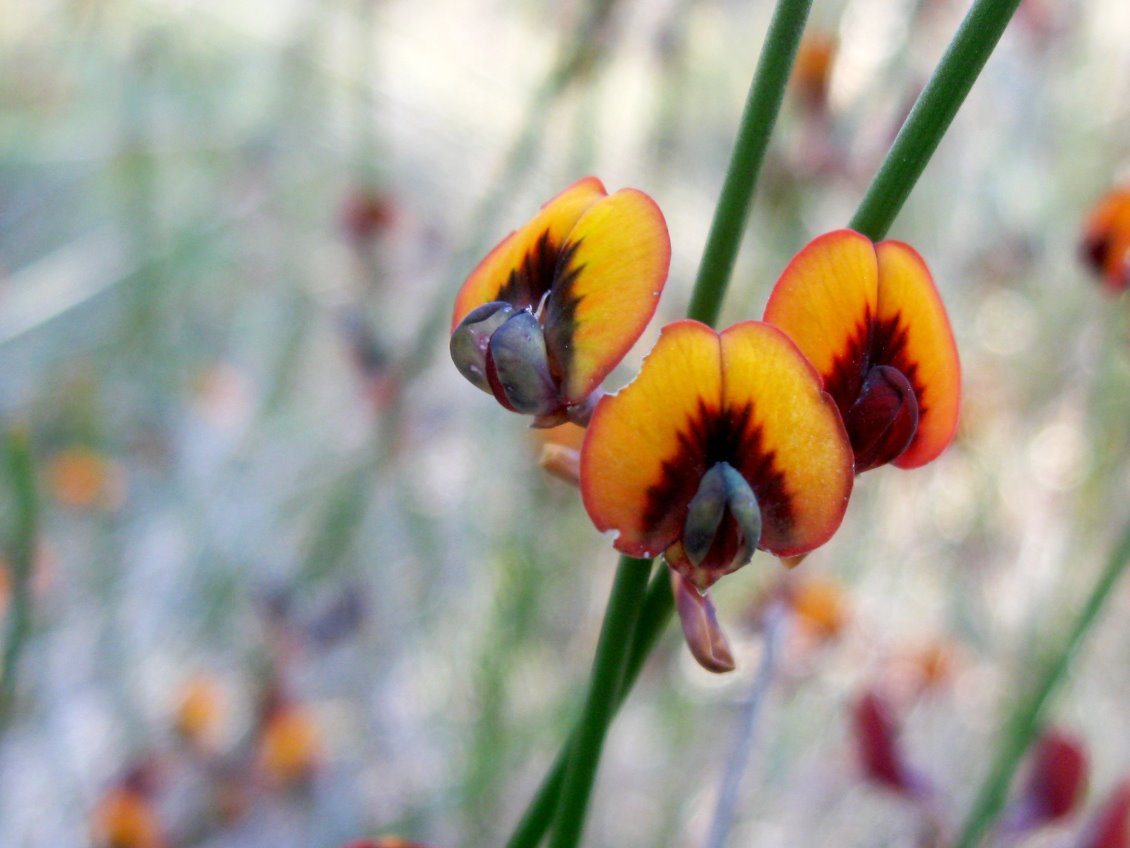
- In Kings Park, Perth

Scientific classification
- Kingdom: Plantae
- Clade: Tracheophytes
- Clade: Angiosperms
- Clade: Eudicots
- Clade: Rosids
- Order: Fabales
- Family: Fabaceae
- Subfamily: Faboideae
- Genus: Daviesia
- Species: D. triflora

Binomial name
- Daviesia triflora Crisp

= Daviesia triflora =

Species of legume

Daviesia triflora is a species of flowering plant in the family Fabaceae and is endemic to South West Australia. It is a rush-like, leafless shrub with many stems, and orange-yellow and dark flowers.

== Description ==
Daviesia triflora is a rush-like shrub that typically grows to a height of up to 60 cm (24 in) and has many stems, its phyllodes reduced to small scales. The flowers are usually arranged in a cluster of three in leaf axils on a peduncle about 2 mm (0.079 in) long, the about rachis 1.5 mm (0.059 in) long, each flower on a pedicel 3–6 mm (0.12–0.24 in) long. The sepals are 2.5–3.5 mm (0.098–0.138 in) long and joined to form a bell-shaped base with five lobes. The upper two lobes are joined for most of their length and the lower three are about 1 mm (0.039 in) long. The standard petal is broadly egg-shaped, 8–9 mm (0.31–0.35 in) long and 7.5–8.0 mm (0.30–0.31 in) wide, and yellow or yellow-orange and dark red. The wings are 6.0–6.5 mm (0.24–0.26 in) long and dark red, the keel 5.0–5.5 mm (0.20–0.22 in) long and dark red. Flowering occurs from May to September and the fruit is a flattened triangular pod 10–20 mm (0.39–0.79 in) long.

== Taxonomy ==
Daviesia triflora was first formally described in 1984 by Michael Crisp from specimens collected by Charles Chapman near the junction of the Green Head road and the Brand Highway in 1976. The specific epithet (triflora) means "three-flowered".

== Distribution and habitat ==
This daviesia usually grows on sandy soil in heath or open forest and occurs from near Mullewa to Perth in the Avon Wheatbelt, Geraldton Sandplains, Jarrah Forest and Swan Coastal Plain bioregions of south-western Western Australia.

== Conservation status ==
Daviesia triflora is classified as "not threatened" by the Government of Western Australia Department of Biodiversity, Conservation and Attractions.
