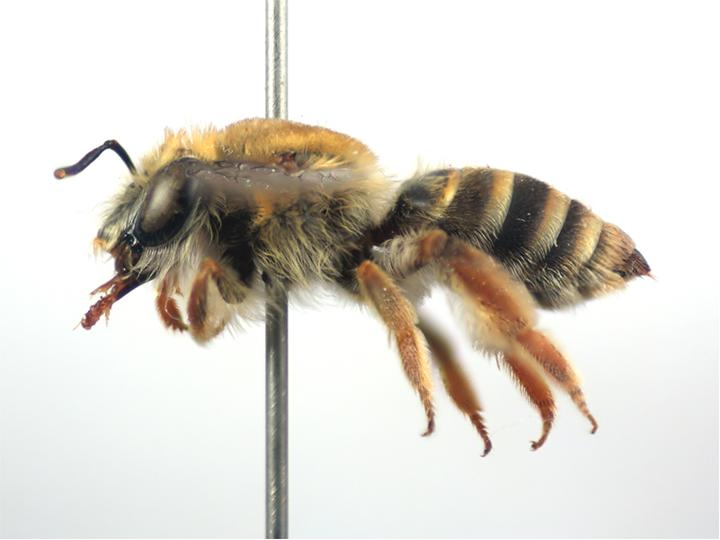
- Female

Scientific classification
- Kingdom: Animalia
- Phylum: Arthropoda
- Clade: Pancrustacea
- Class: Insecta
- Order: Hymenoptera
- Family: Colletidae
- Genus: Trichocolletes
- Species: T. aeratus

Binomial name
- Trichocolletes aeratus Batley & Houston, 2012

= Trichocolletes aeratus =

Species of bee

Trichocolletes aeratus is a species of bee in the family Colletidae and the subfamily Colletinae. It is endemic to Australia. It was described in 2012 by Australian entomologists Michael Batley and Terry Houston.

== Etymology ==
The specific epithet aeratus (Latin: 'trimmed with brass') refers to the bees’ appearance.

== Description ==
The body length is about 10–11 mm. The eyes are not hairy. Colouration is mainly black, yellow and orange-brown, with wide, brassy, metasomal bands.

== Distribution and habitat ==
The species occurs in south-eastern Queensland and the central slopes and tablelands of New South Wales. The type locality is Bilpin, New South Wales.

== Behaviour ==
The adults are flying mellivores. Flowering plants visited by the bees include Daviesia mimosoides, Daviesia latifolia, Daviesia leptophylla, Hardenbergia violacea and Podolobium ilicifolium, as well as Helipterum and Pultenaea species.

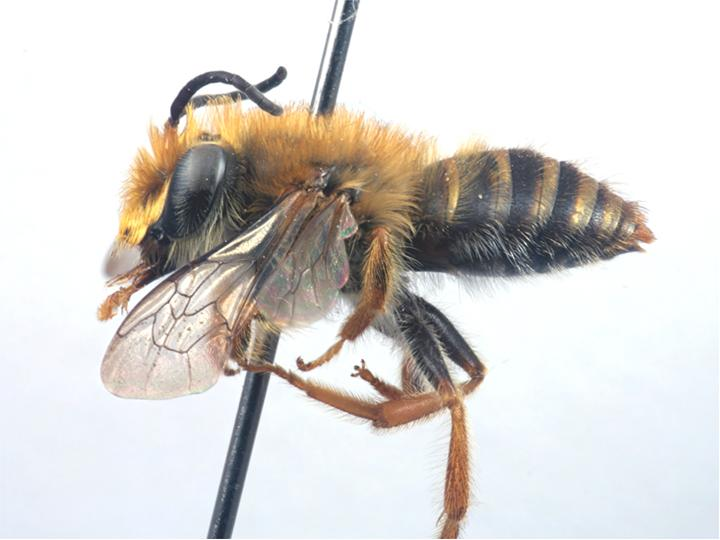
Male
