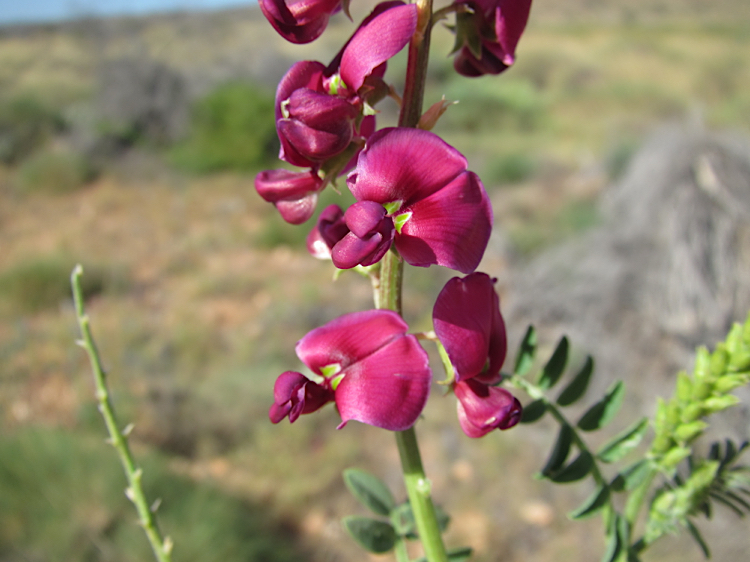
- In the Cape Range National Park

Scientific classification
- Kingdom: Plantae
- Clade: Tracheophytes
- Clade: Angiosperms
- Clade: Eudicots
- Clade: Rosids
- Order: Fabales
- Family: Fabaceae
- Subfamily: Faboideae
- Genus: Swainsona
- Species: S. pterostylis

Binomial name
- Swainsona pterostylis (DC.) Bakh.f.

Synonyms
- Astragalus pterostylis DC.; Diplolobium walcottii F.Muell.; Diplolobium walcottii F.Muell. isonym; Swainsona occidentalis F.Muell.; Swainsonia occidentalis F.Muell. orth. var.

= Swainsona pterostylis =

Species of plant

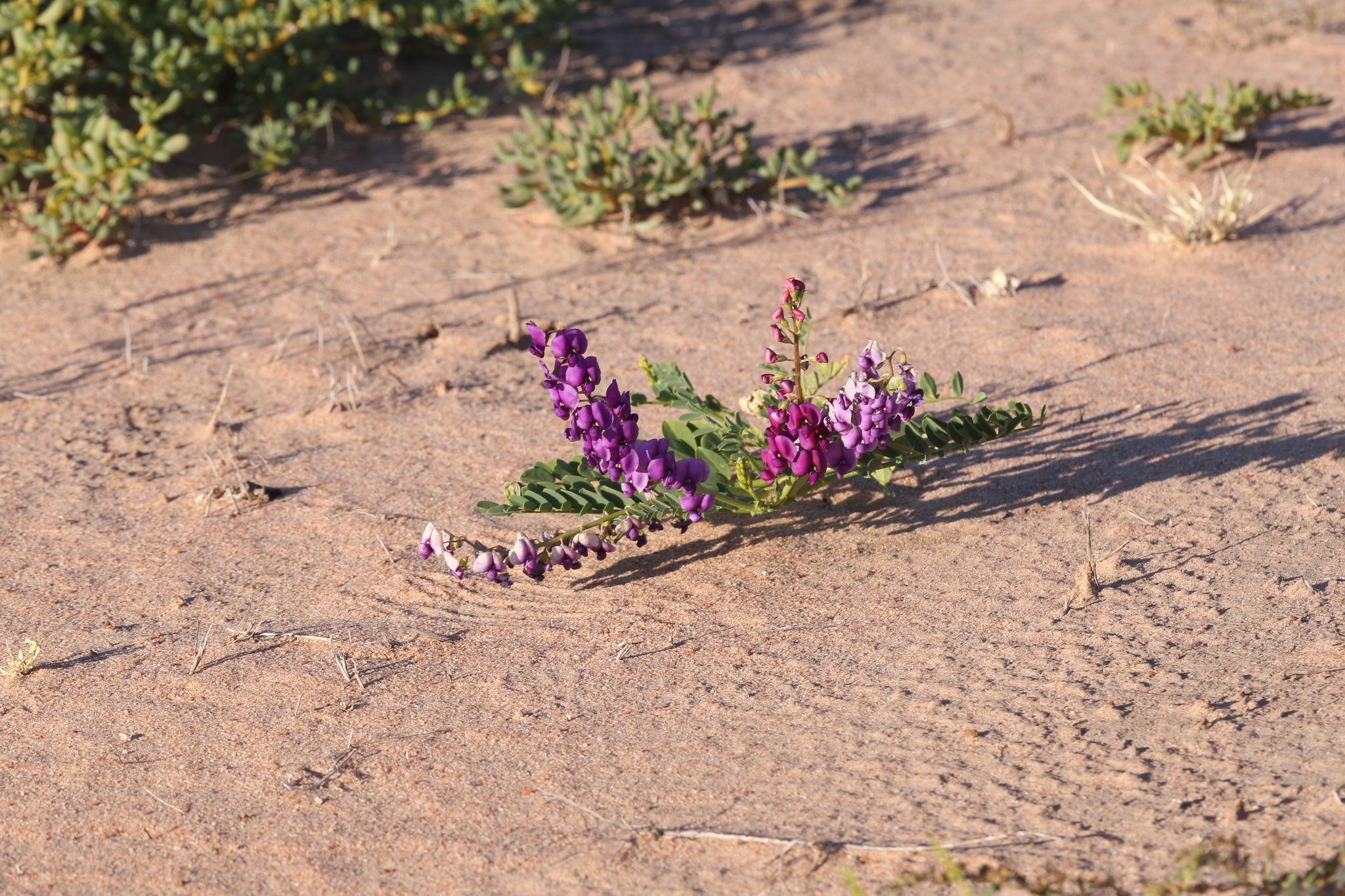
Habit near Pardoo Station

Swainsona pterostylis is a species of flowering plant in the family Fabaceae and is endemic to northern parts of Western Australia. It is a low-growing or prostrate perennial herb, with imparipinnate leaves with mostly 11 to 19 broadly elliptic leaflets, and racemes of 5 to more than 30 purple or violet flowers.

== Description ==
Swainsona pterostylis is low-growing or prostrate perennial herb, that typically grows to a height of up to about 15–40 cm (5.9–15.7 in) high, and usually has 3 hairy stems. Its leaves are imparipinnate, mostly 40–120 mm (1.6–4.7 in) long on a petiole, with mostly 11 to 19, broadly elliptic to narrowly egg-shaped with the narrower end towards the base, the side leaflets 5–30 mm (0.20–1.18 in) long and 2–10 mm (0.079–0.394 in) wide. There is a stipule 2–10 mm (0.079–0.394 in) long at the base of the petiole. The flowers are arranged in racemes 50–300 mm (2.0–11.8 in) long with 5 to more than 30 flowers on a peduncle about 1–3 mm (0.039–0.118 in) wide, each flower 7–10 mm (0.28–0.39 in) long on a pedicel 2–3 mm (0.079–0.118 in) long. The sepals are joined at the base, forming a tube about 2 mm (0.079 in) long, the sepal lobes equal to or about as long as the tube. The petals are purple to violet, the standard petal about 9–10 mm (0.35–0.39 in) long and 10–14 mm (0.39–0.55 in) wide, the wings 8–10 mm (0.31–0.39 in) long, and the keel about 7–9 mm (0.28–0.35 in) long and 2.5–3.5 mm (0.098–0.138 in) deep. Flowering occurs from April to October, and the fruit is oblong to almost spherical, 6–12 mm (0.24–0.47 in) long and 5–8 mm (0.20–0.31 in) wide.

== Taxonomy and naming ==
This species was first formally described in 1825 by Augustin Pyramus de Candolle who gave it the name Astragalus pterostylis in his Prodromus Systematis Naturalis Regni Vegetabilis. In 1967, Reinier van den Brink transferred the species to Swainsona as S. pterostylis. The specific epithet (pterostylis) means "having a style".

== Distribution and habitat ==
Swainsona pterostylis grows on coastal sandhills and red claypans, often in limy or salty soils in the Avon Wheatbelt, Carnarvon, Dampierland, Gascoyne, Geraldton Sandplains, Great Sandy Desert, Murchison, Pilbara and Yalgoo bioregions of northern Western Australia.
