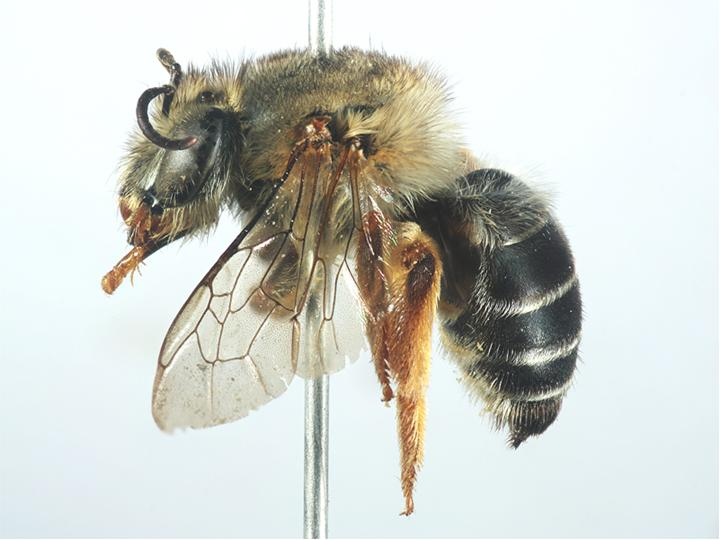
- Female

Scientific classification
- Kingdom: Animalia
- Phylum: Arthropoda
- Clade: Pancrustacea
- Class: Insecta
- Order: Hymenoptera
- Family: Colletidae
- Genus: Trichocolletes
- Species: T. capillosus

Binomial name
- Trichocolletes capillosus Batley & Houston, 2012

= Trichocolletes capillosus =

Species of bee

Trichocolletes capillosus is a species of bee in the family Colletidae and the subfamily Colletinae. It is endemic to Australia. It was described in 2012 by Australian entomologists Michael Batley and Terry Houston.

== Etymology ==
The specific epithet capillosus (Latin: 'very hairy') refers to the dense hair on the male femora.

== Description ==
The body length is about 11–12 mm. The eyes are hairy. Colouration is mainly black and orange-brown, with narrow silver metasomal bands and orange to pale brown hair.

== Distribution and habitat ==
The species occurs mainly in the Avon Wheatbelt bioregion of Western Australia. The type locality is Coomberdale.

== Behaviour ==
The adults are flying mellivores. Flowering plants visited by the bees include Gastrolobium crassifolium as well as Daviesia and Pultenaea species.

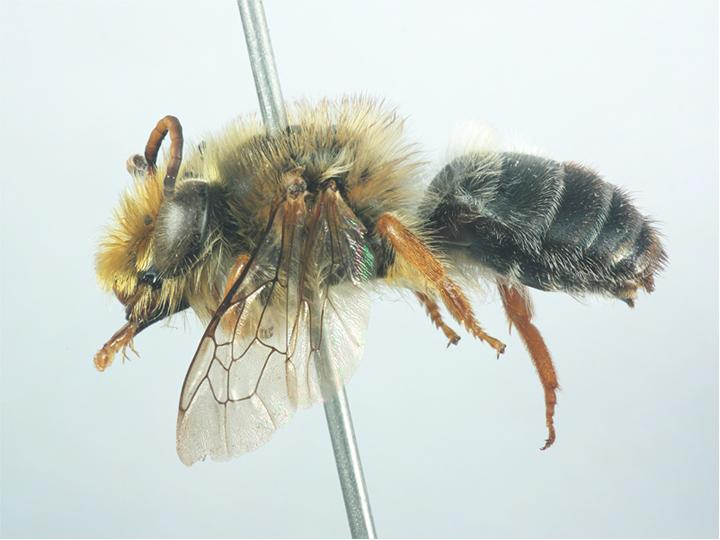
Male
