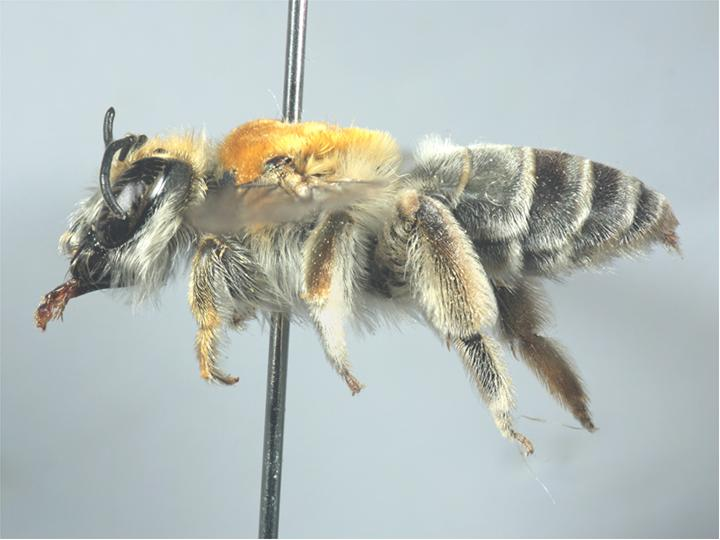
- Female

Scientific classification
- Kingdom: Animalia
- Phylum: Arthropoda
- Clade: Pancrustacea
- Class: Insecta
- Order: Hymenoptera
- Family: Colletidae
- Genus: Trichocolletes
- Species: T. maximus

Binomial name
- Trichocolletes maximus (Cockerell, 1929)

Synonyms
- Paracolletes maximus Cockerell, 1929

= Trichocolletes maximus =

Species of bee

Trichocolletes maximus is a species of bee in the family Colletidae and the subfamily Colletinae. It is endemic to Australia. It was described in 1929 by British-American entomologist Theodore Dru Alison Cockerell.

== Description ==
The body length is 13–14 mm. The eyes are hairy. Colouration is mainly black, with silver-white metasomal bands, and with reddish-brown hair.

== Distribution and habitat ==
The species occurs in inland eastern Australia from southern Queensland southwards through New South Wales to northern Victoria.

== Behaviour ==
The adults are flying mellivores. Flowering plants visited by the bees include Swainsona procumbens.

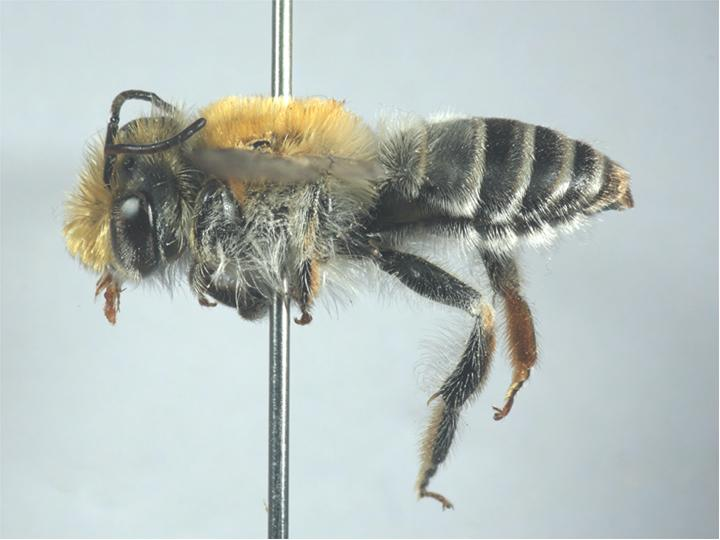
Male
