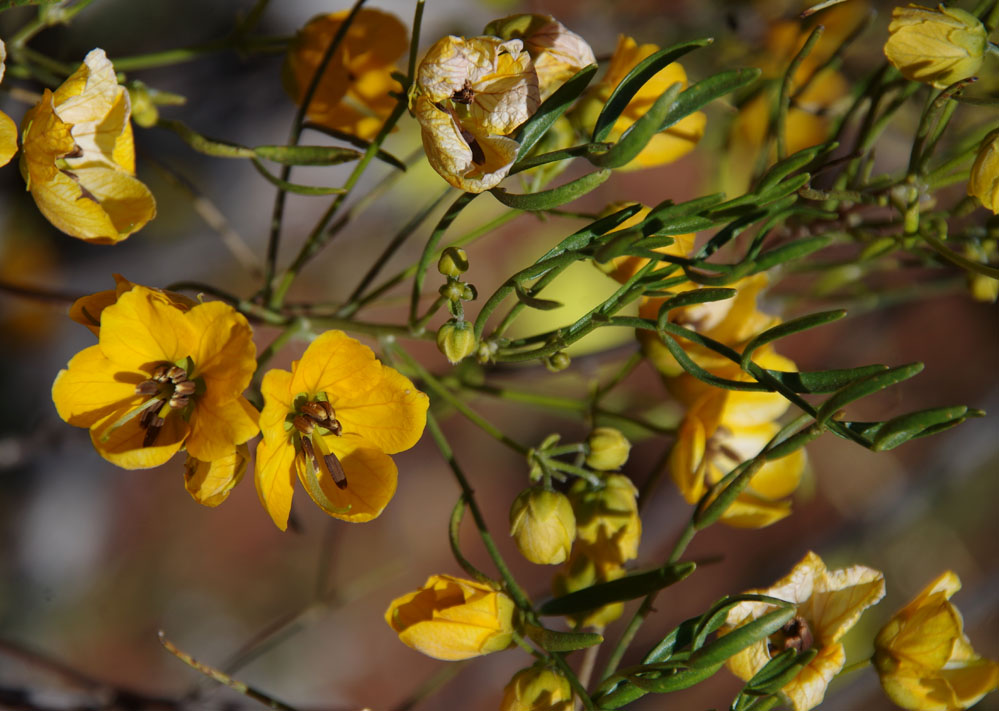
- Subspecies chatelainiana in Coalseam Conservation Park

Scientific classification
- Kingdom: Plantae
- Clade: Tracheophytes
- Clade: Angiosperms
- Clade: Eudicots
- Clade: Rosids
- Order: Fabales
- Family: Fabaceae
- Subfamily: Caesalpinioideae
- Genus: Senna
- Species: S. glutinosa

Binomial name
- Senna glutinosa (DC.) Randell

Synonyms
- Cassia glutinosa DC.; Cassia glutinosa var. 'B' Vogel; Senna form taxon 'glutinosa'

= Senna glutinosa =

Species of legume

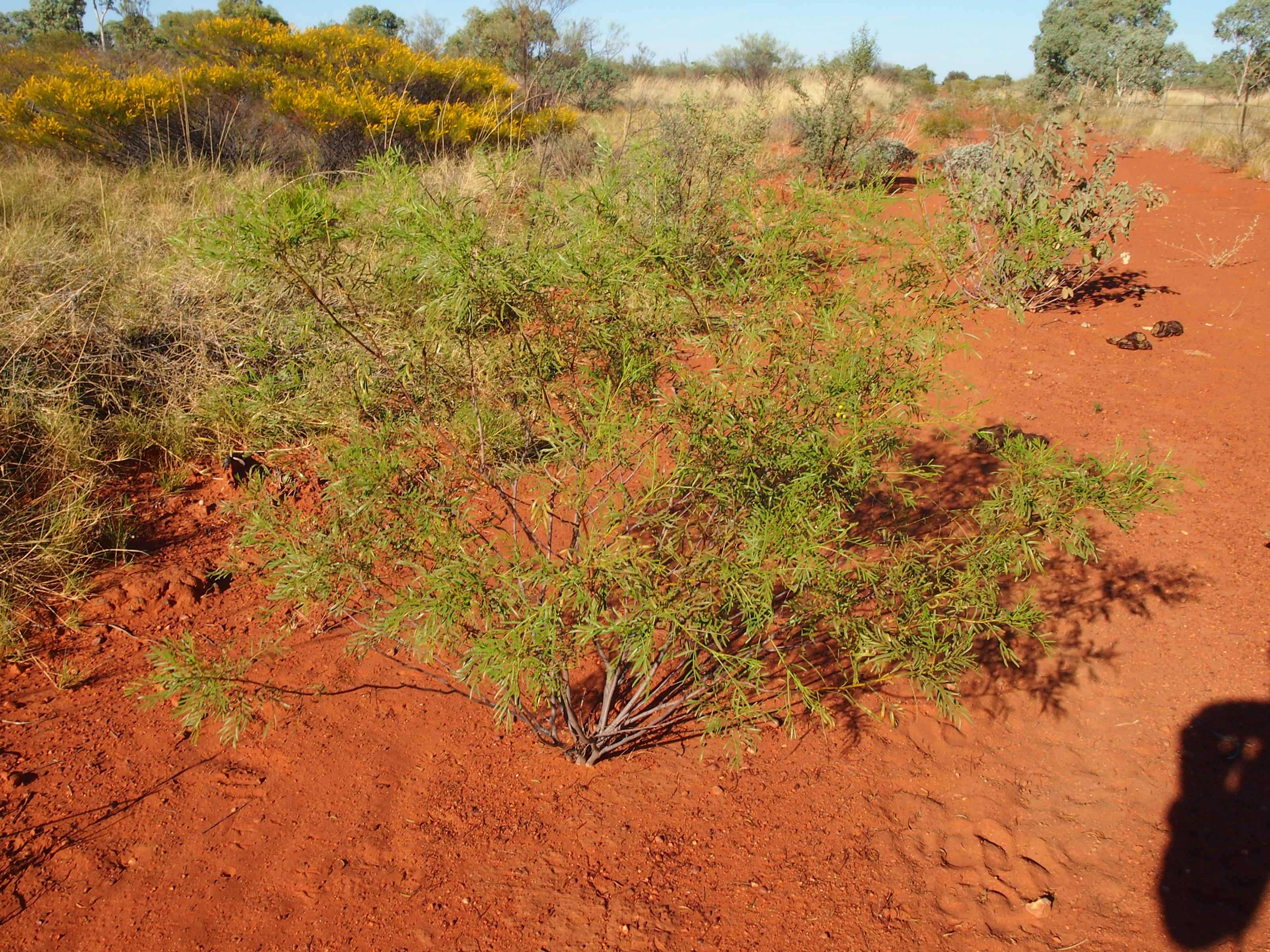
Habit, subspecies glutinosa

Senna glutinosa is a species of flowering plant in the family Fabaceae and is endemic to central and northern arid areas of Australia. It is a shrub or small tree with pinnate leaves with up to seven pairs of leaflets, their shape depending on subspecies, and yellow flowers arranged in groups with ten fertile stamens in each flower.

== Description ==
Senna glutinosa is a more or less glabrous, erect or straggling shrub or small tree, that typically grows to a height of 0.3–4 m (1 ft 0 in – 13 ft 1 in), its stems, leaves and outer flower parts sticky. The leaves are pinnate with up to seven pairs of leaflets spaced more than 6 mm (0.24 in) apart, on a petiole more than 6 mm (0.24 in) long, the size and shaped of the leaflets varying with subspecies. The flowers are yellow and arranged in groups near the ends of branches, the sepals oval, 8–10 mm (0.31–0.39 in) long and greenish-yellow. The petals are oval, 11–15 mm (0.43–0.59 in) long and there are ten fertile stamens in each flower, the anthers 4–5 mm (0.16–0.20 in) long. The fruit is a flat pod 50–70 mm (2.0–2.8 in) long and 10–20 mm (0.39–0.79 in) wide.

== Taxonomy ==
This species was first formally described in 1825 by Augustin Pyramus de Candolle who gave it the name Cassia glutinosa in his Prodromus Systematis Naturalis Regni Vegetabilis. In 1989, Barbara Rae Randell transferred the species to the genus Senna as S. glutinosa in the Journal of the Adelaide Botanic Gardens. The specific epithet (glutinosa) means "sticky", referring to the stems, leaves and pedicels.

In the same journal, Randell described four subspecies of S. glutinosa, and the names are accepted by the Australian Plant Census:

- Senna glutinosa subsp. chatelainiana (Gaudich.) Randell (previously known as Cassia chatelainiana Gaudich.) has leaves 40–60 mm (1.6–2.4 in) long with three to six pairs of narrowly elliptic leaflets 6–20 mm (0.24–0.79 in) long and 1–4 mm (0.039–0.157 in) wide spaced 10–25 mm (0.39–0.98 in) apart, on a cylindrical petiole 10–20 mm (0.39–0.79 in) long with up to four stalked, pointed glands between the lowest pairs of leaflets.
- Senna glutinosa (DC.) Randell subsp. glutinosa (Gaudich.) Randell has leaves 30–50 mm (1.2–2.0 in) long with four to six pairs of elliptic leaflets 10–25 mm (0.39–0.98 in) long and 3–6 mm (0.12–0.24 in) wide spaced 10–15 mm (0.39–0.59 in) apart, on a cylindrical petiole 10–15 mm (0.39–0.59 in) long with up to three sessile, flat glands between the lowest pairs of leaflets.
- Senna glutinosa subsp. × luerssenii (Domin) Randell (previously known as Cassia × luerssenii Domin) has leaves 40–80 mm (1.6–3.1 in) long with four to seven pairs of narrowly to broadly elliptic leaflets 8–18 mm (0.31–0.71 in) long and 1–4 mm (0.039–0.157 in) wide spaced 7–12 mm (0.28–0.47 in) apart, on a cylindrical petiole about 15 mm (0.59 in) long with up to three sessile and flat, or stalked and pointed glands.
- Senna glutinosa subsp. pruinosa (F.Muell.) Randell (previously known as Cassia pruinosa subsp. pruinosa F.Muell.) has leaves 50–100 mm (2.0–3.9 in) long with three to five pairs of elliptic leaflets 10–20 mm (0.39–0.79 in) long and 4–7 mm (0.16–0.28 in) wide spaced 8–10 mm (0.31–0.39 in) apart, on a cylindrical petiole 10–15 mm (0.39–0.59 in) long with up to three sessile, flat glands between the lowest pairs of leaflets.

== Distribution and habitat ==
Senna glutinosa grows in arid shrubland in all mainland states of Australia and the Northern Territory, but not in Victoria. Subspecies chatelainiana in the central west of Western Australia, and subsp. glutinosa from the north-west of Western Australia to the Northern Territory and north-western South Australia. Subspecies × luerssenii occurs from the central coast of Western Australia to near the Northern Territory border, and subsp. pruinosa is found from north-western Western Australia to far northern South Australia, and far western Queensland and New South Wales.

== Conservation status ==
All four subspecies of S. glutinosa are listed as "not threatened" by the Government of Western Australia Department of Biodiversity, Conservation and Attractions.
