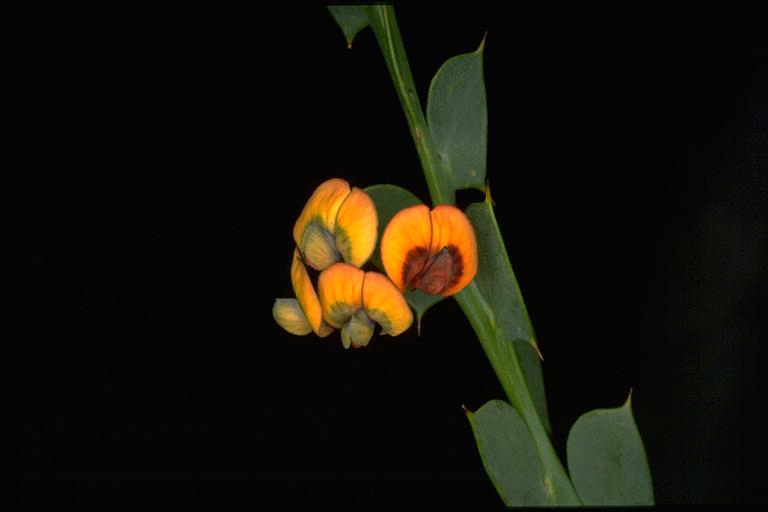
- In the Australian National Botanic Gardens

Scientific classification
- Kingdom: Plantae
- Clade: Tracheophytes
- Clade: Angiosperms
- Clade: Eudicots
- Clade: Rosids
- Order: Fabales
- Family: Fabaceae
- Subfamily: Faboideae
- Genus: Daviesia
- Species: D. quadrilatera

Binomial name
- Daviesia quadrilatera Benth. ex Lindl.

= Daviesia quadrilatera =

Species of flowering plant

Daviesia quadrilatera, commonly known as buggery bush, is a species of flowering plant in the family Fabaceae and is endemic to the south-west of Western Australia. It is a robust, erect, glabrous shrub with angular branchlets, vertically flattened, sharply-pointed quadrilateral or triangular phyllodes with a sharp point on the end, and yellow to orange and red flowers.

== Description ==
Daviesia quadrilatera is a robust, erect, glabrous, more or less glaucous shrub that typically grows up to 1.2 m (3 ft 11 in) high and 1 m (3 ft 3 in) wide, and has erect branchlets. Its phyllodes are erect, vertically flattened, quadrilateral or triangular, up to 17–21 mm (0.67–0.83 in) long and 6–13 mm (0.24–0.51 in) wide and sharply pointed. The flowers are usually arranged singly in leaf axils on a peduncle 1–2.5 mm (0.039–0.098 in) long, each flower on a pedicel 1–4 mm (0.039–0.157 in) long with spatula-shaped bracts about 0.75 mm (0.030 in) long at the base. The sepals are 4.0–4.5 mm (0.16–0.18 in) long and joined at the base, the upper two lobes joined for most of their length and the lower three triangular. The standard petal is elliptic, 7.0–8.5 mm (0.28–0.33 in) long, 7.5–9 mm (0.30–0.35 in) wide, and yellow to orange with a red base. The wings are 7.5–8.0 mm (0.30–0.31 in) long and red, the keel about 8–9 mm (0.31–0.35 in) long. Flowering occurs from July to September and the fruit is an inflated, triangular pod 14–16 mm (0.55–0.63 in) long.

== Taxonomy and naming ==
Daviesia quadrilatera was first formally described in 1839 by John Lindley in A Sketch of the Vegetation of the Swan River Colony from an unpublished description by George Bentham. The specific epithet (quadrilatera) means "four-sided", referring to the shape of the phyllodes.

== Distribution and habitat ==
This daviesia grows in kwongan between New Norcia and Dongara, and is common in the area between Green Head, Coorow and Three Springs, in the Avon Wheatbelt and Geraldton Sandplains biogeographic regions of south-western Western Australia.

== Conservation status ==
Daviesia quadrilatera is listed as "not threatened" by the Western Australian Government Department of Biodiversity, Conservation and Attractions.
