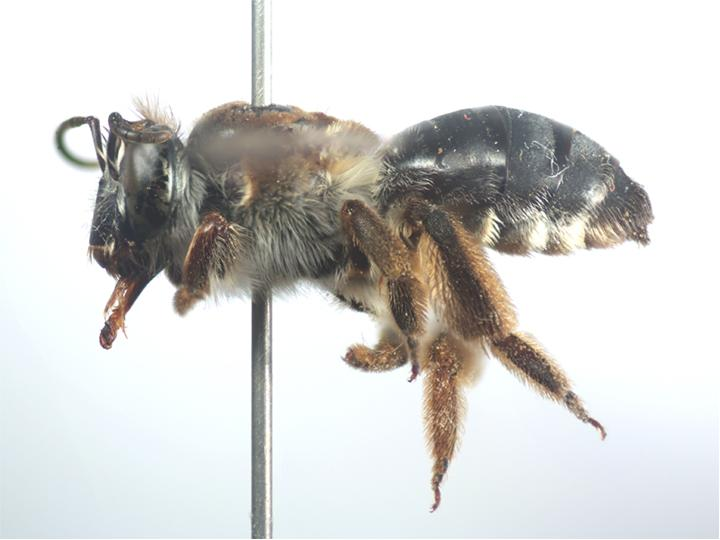
- Female

Scientific classification
- Kingdom: Animalia
- Phylum: Arthropoda
- Clade: Pancrustacea
- Class: Insecta
- Order: Hymenoptera
- Family: Colletidae
- Genus: Trichocolletes
- Species: T. burnsi

Binomial name
- Trichocolletes burnsi Michener, 1965

= Trichocolletes burnsi =

Species of bee

Trichocolletes burnsi is a species of bee in the family Colletidae and the subfamily Colletinae. It is endemic to Australia. It was described in 1965 by American entomologist Charles Duncan Michener.

== Description ==
The body length is 12–14 mm. The eyes are not hairy. Colouration is mainly black, with indistinct metasomal bands.

== Distribution and habitat ==
The species occurs in south-eastern Australia. The type locality is Wentworth Falls, New South Wales.

== Behaviour ==
The adults are flying mellivores.

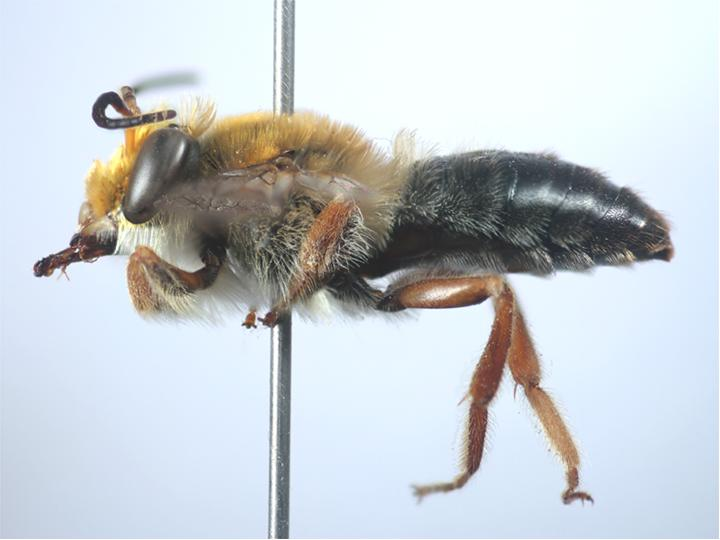
Male
