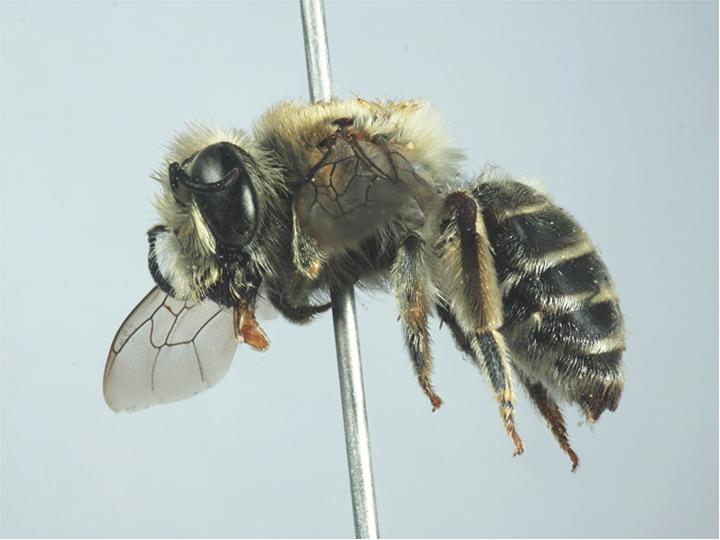
- Female

Scientific classification
- Kingdom: Animalia
- Phylum: Arthropoda
- Clade: Pancrustacea
- Class: Insecta
- Order: Hymenoptera
- Family: Colletidae
- Genus: Trichocolletes
- Species: T. tuberatus

Binomial name
- Trichocolletes tuberatus Batley & Houston, 2012

= Trichocolletes tuberatus =

Species of bee

Trichocolletes tuberatus is a species of bee in the family Colletidae and the subfamily Colletinae. It is endemic to Australia. It was described in 2012 by Australian entomologists Michael Batley and Terry Houston.

== Etymology ==
The specific epithet tuberatus (Latin: 'with a tubercle') is an anatomical reference to the presence of labral tubercles.

== Description ==
The body length is about 11 mm. The eyes are hairy. Colouration is mainly black and brown, with white to orange-brown hair. The bees have silver metasomal bands.

== Distribution and habitat ==
The species occurs in the Mulga Lands bioregion of inland northern New South Wales and southern Queensland The type locality is 78 km south of Bourke, New South Wales.

== Behaviour ==
The adults are flying mellivores that are active in late spring and summer. Flowering plants visited by the bees include Glycine canescens, Swainsona affinis and Swainsona microphylla.

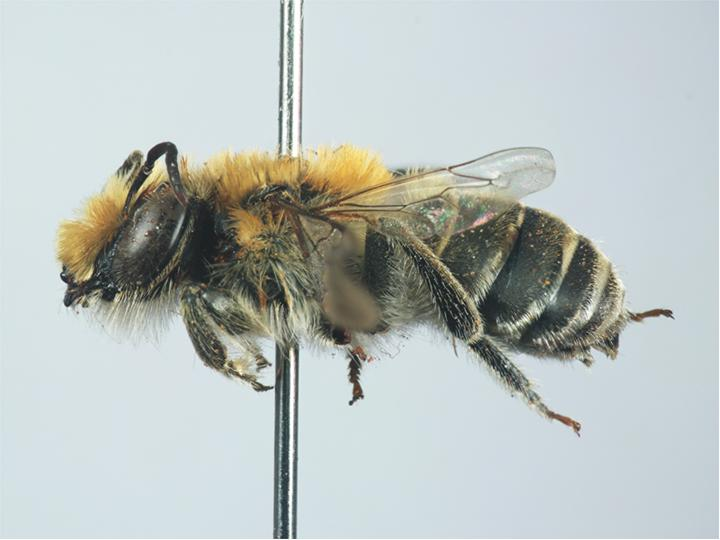
Male
