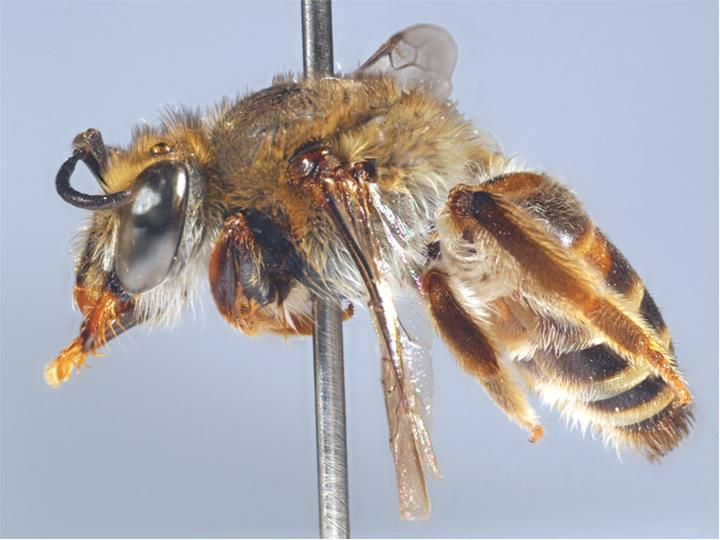
- Female

Scientific classification
- Kingdom: Animalia
- Phylum: Arthropoda
- Clade: Pancrustacea
- Class: Insecta
- Order: Hymenoptera
- Family: Colletidae
- Genus: Trichocolletes
- Species: T. rufibasis

Binomial name
- Trichocolletes rufibasis (Cockerell, 1929)

Synonyms
- Paracolletes rufibasis Cockerell, 1929

= Trichocolletes rufibasis =

Species of bee

Trichocolletes rufibasis is a species of bee in the family Colletidae and the subfamily Colletinae. It is endemic to Australia. It was described in 1929 by British-American entomologist Theodore Dru Alison Cockerell.

== Description ==
The male body length is 12 mm. The eyes are not hairy. Colouration is mainly back, with gold, orange-brown and red markings, and with white and yellow hair.

== Distribution and habitat ==
The species occurs in Western Australia and South Australia. The type locality is Eradu.

== Behaviour ==
The adults are flying mellivores. Flowering plants visited by the bees include Daviesia costata, Daviesia aphylla, Dryandra arborea, Mirbelia depressa and Swainsona microphylla.

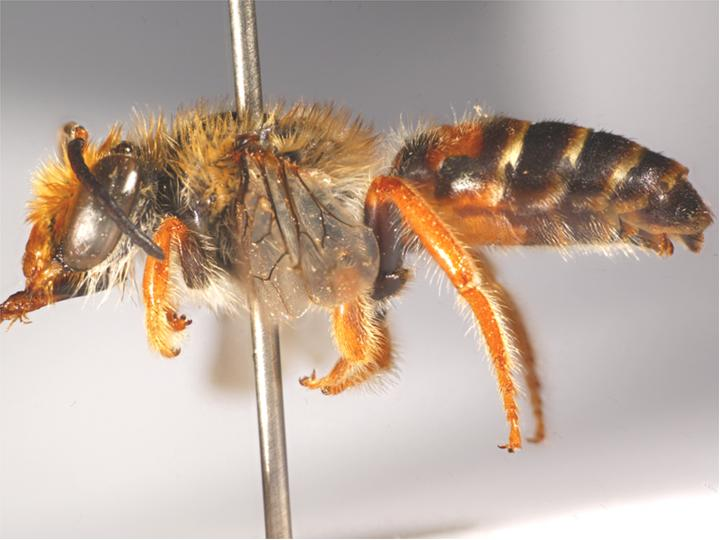
Male
