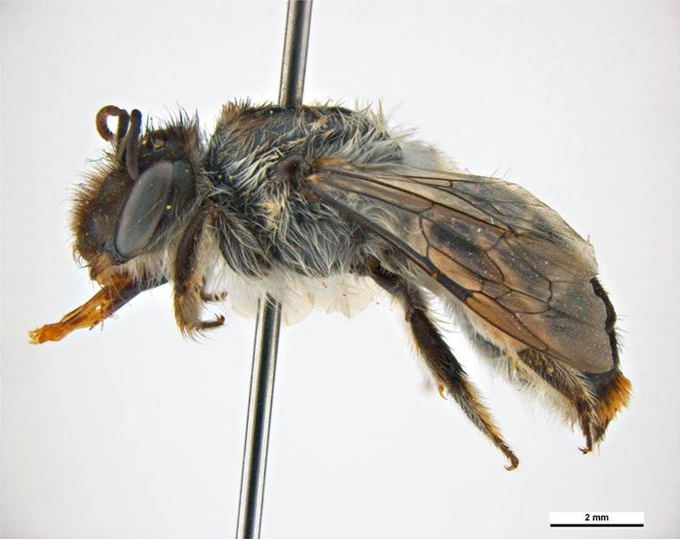
- Female

Scientific classification
- Kingdom: Animalia
- Phylum: Arthropoda
- Clade: Pancrustacea
- Class: Insecta
- Order: Hymenoptera
- Family: Colletidae
- Genus: Trichocolletes
- Species: T. multipectinatus

Binomial name
- Trichocolletes multipectinatus Houston, 1990

= Trichocolletes multipectinatus =

Species of bee

Trichocolletes multipectinatus is a species of bee in the family Colletidae and the subfamily Colletinae. It is endemic to Australia. It was described in 1990 by Australian entomologist Terry Houston.

== Etymology ==
The specific epithet multipectinatus (Latin: 'many combs') is an anatomical reference to the pectinate tibial spurs of females.

== Description ==
The body length is about 12 mm. The eyes are not hairy. Colouration is mainly black and yellow-brown.

== Distribution and habitat ==
The species occurs across much of inland southern Australia from Western Australia through the northern Eyre Peninsula to western New South Wales. The type locality is Meleya Well on Thundelarra Station in the Murchison region of Western Australia.

== Behaviour ==
The adults are flying mellivores. Flowering plants visited by the bees include Eremophila pantonii.

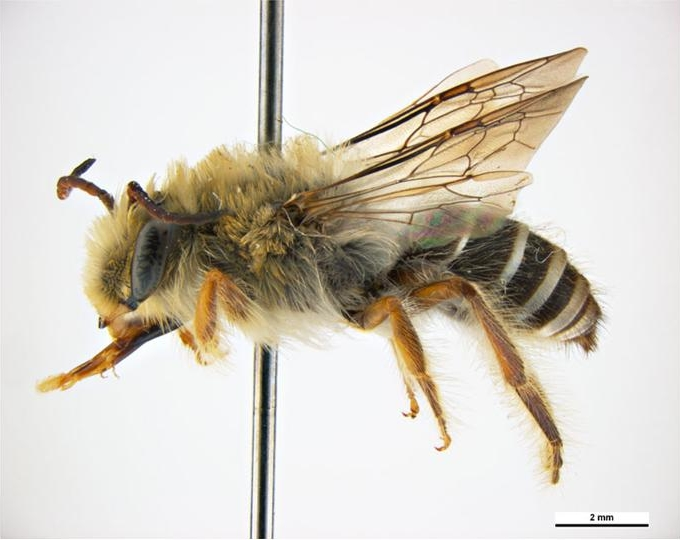
Male
