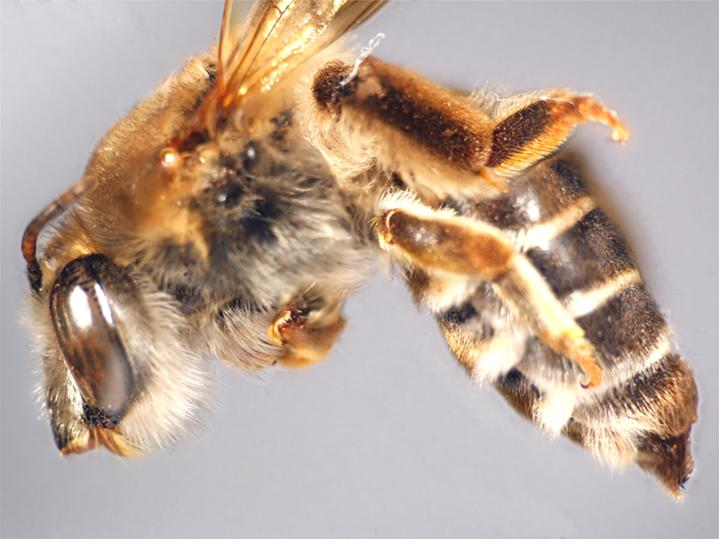
- Female

Scientific classification
- Kingdom: Animalia
- Phylum: Arthropoda
- Clade: Pancrustacea
- Class: Insecta
- Order: Hymenoptera
- Family: Colletidae
- Genus: Trichocolletes
- Species: T. marginatus

Binomial name
- Trichocolletes marginatus (Smith, 1879)

Synonyms
- Paracolletes marginatus Smith, 1879

= Trichocolletes marginatus =

Species of bee

Trichocolletes marginatus is a species of bee in the family Colletidae and the subfamily Colletinae. It is endemic to Australia. It was described in 1879 by English entomologist Frederick Smith.

== Description ==
Colouration is mainly black and glossy, with reddish markings, and with white to brownish hair.

== Distribution and habitat ==
The species occurs in eastern Australia. The type locality is Dunwich, Queensland.

== Behaviour ==
The adults are flying mellivores. Flowering plants visited by the bees include Jacksonia species.

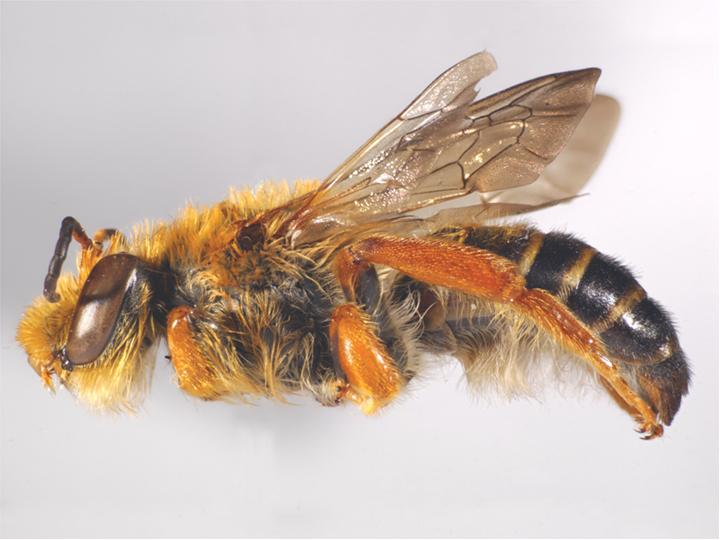
Male
