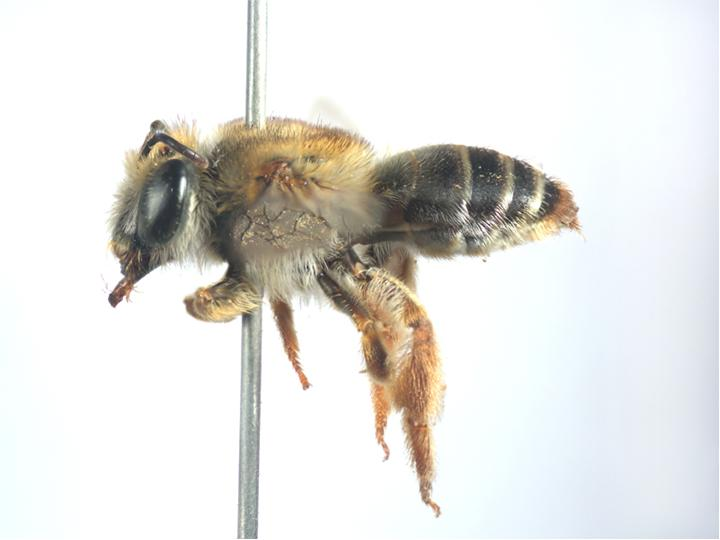
- Female

Scientific classification
- Kingdom: Animalia
- Phylum: Arthropoda
- Clade: Pancrustacea
- Class: Insecta
- Order: Hymenoptera
- Family: Colletidae
- Genus: Trichocolletes
- Species: T. albigenae

Binomial name
- Trichocolletes albigenae Batley & Houston, 2012

= Trichocolletes albigenae =

Species of bee

Trichocolletes albigenae is a species of bee in the family Colletidae and the subfamily Colletinae. It is endemic to Australia. It was described in 2012 by Australian entomologists Michael Batley and Terry Houston.

== Etymology ==
The specific epithet albigenae (Latin: 'white cheeks') refers to the bees’ appearance.

== Description ==
The body length is about 11 mm. The eyes are hairy. Colouration is mainly black and dark brown to orange-brown, with white markings, narrow silver metasomal bands, and white and orange hair.

== Distribution and habitat ==
The species occurs in eastern New South Wales. The type locality is Doyles Creek in the Sydney Basin region.

== Behaviour ==
The adults are flying mellivores. Flowering plants visited by the bees include Daviesia genistifolia and Templetonia sulcata, as well as Dillwynia species.

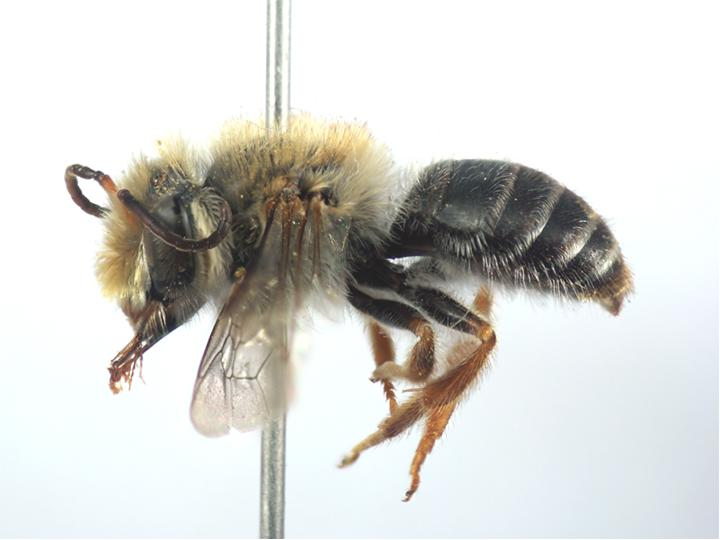
Male
