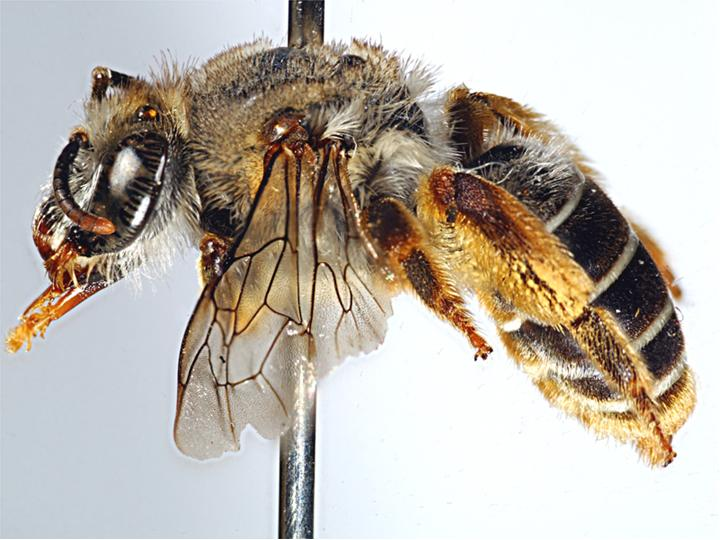
- Female

Scientific classification
- Kingdom: Animalia
- Phylum: Arthropoda
- Clade: Pancrustacea
- Class: Insecta
- Order: Hymenoptera
- Family: Colletidae
- Genus: Trichocolletes
- Species: T. chrysostomus

Binomial name
- Trichocolletes chrysostomus (Cockerell, 1929)

Synonyms
- Paracolletes chrysostomus Cockerell, 1929; Paracolletes marginatus lucidus Cockerell, 1929

= Trichocolletes chrysostomus =

Species of bee

Trichocolletes chrysostomus is a species of bee in the family Colletidae and the subfamily Colletinae. It is endemic to Australia. It was described in 1929 by British-American entomologist Theodore Dru Alison Cockerell.

== Description ==
Male body length is 12 mm, female 13 mm. The eyes are not hairy. Colouration is mainly black, with cream and red markings and yellow hair.

== Distribution and habitat ==
The species occurs in coastal Western Australia and southern South Australia. The type locality is Eradu.

== Behaviour ==
The adults are flying mellivores. Flowering plants visited by the bees include Dillwynia uncinata, Daviesia incrassata, Daviesia brevifolia, Jacksonia cupulifera and Bossiaea species.

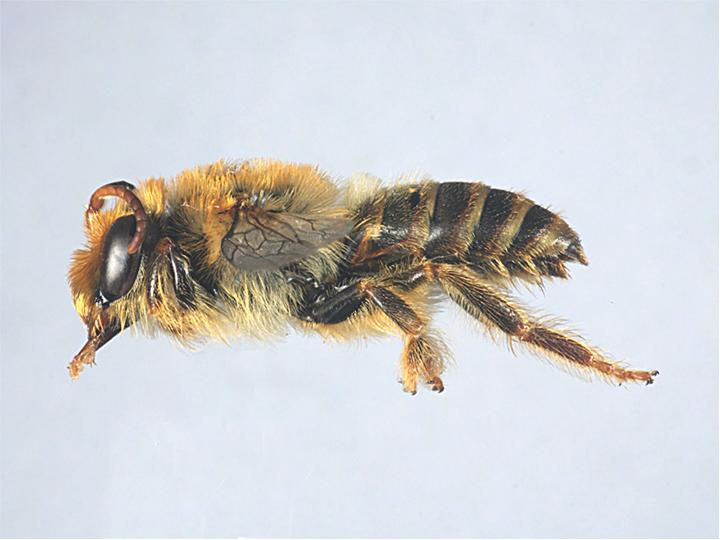
Male
