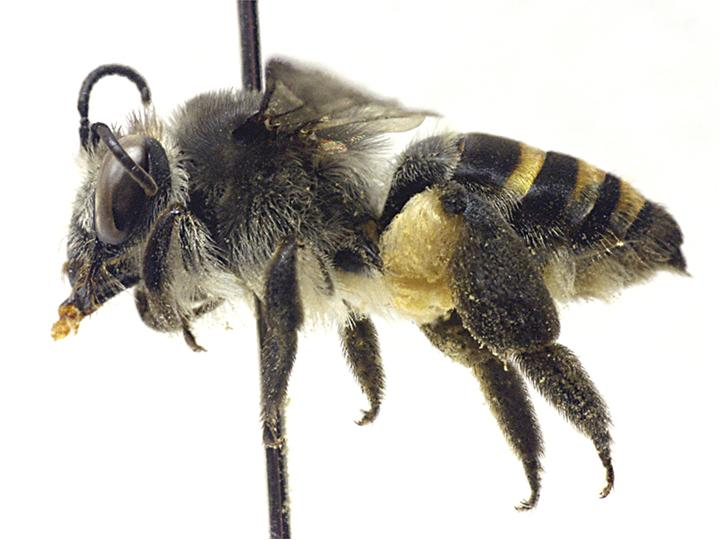
- Female

Scientific classification
- Kingdom: Animalia
- Phylum: Arthropoda
- Clade: Pancrustacea
- Class: Insecta
- Order: Hymenoptera
- Family: Colletidae
- Genus: Trichocolletes
- Species: T. hackeri

Binomial name
- Trichocolletes hackeri (Cockerell, 1913)

Synonyms
- Anthoglossa hackeri Cockerell, 1913

= Trichocolletes hackeri =

Species of bee

Trichocolletes hackeri is a species of bee in the family Colletidae and the subfamily Colletinae. It is endemic to Australia. It was described in 1913 by British-American entomologist Theodore Dru Alison Cockerell.

== Description ==
The eyes are not hairy. The metasoma is dull black with bright, metallic gold bands.

== Distribution and habitat ==
The species occurs in rainforested habitats in south-eastern Queensland. The type locality is Tamborine Mountain. It has also been recorded from the Bunya Mountains.

== Behaviour ==
The adults are flying mellivores. Flowering plants visited by the bees include Syzygium smithii and Parsonsia velutina, as well as Eucalyptus, Solanum and Verticordia species.

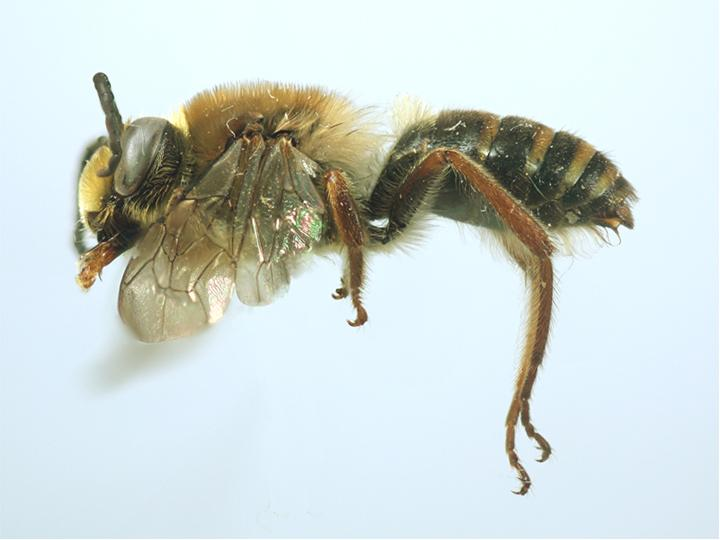
Male
