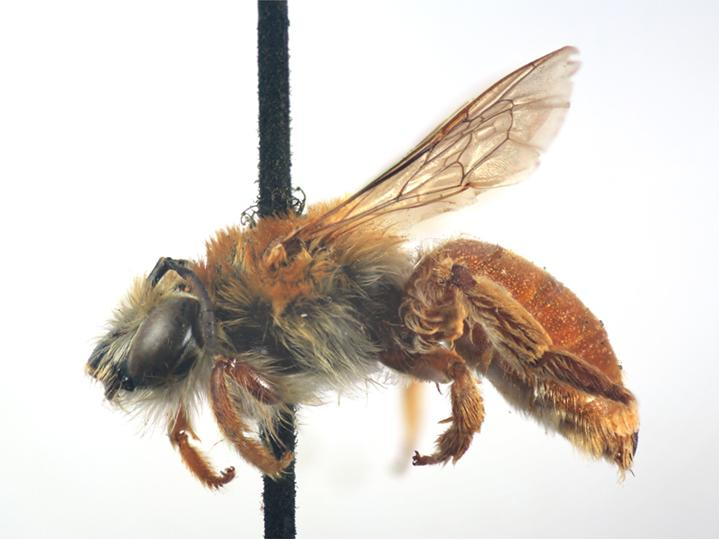
- Female

Scientific classification
- Kingdom: Animalia
- Phylum: Arthropoda
- Clade: Pancrustacea
- Class: Insecta
- Order: Hymenoptera
- Family: Colletidae
- Genus: Trichocolletes
- Species: T. brachytomus

Binomial name
- Trichocolletes brachytomus Batley & Houston, 2012

= Trichocolletes brachytomus =

Species of bee

Trichocolletes brachytomus is a species of bee in the family Colletidae and the subfamily Colletinae. It is endemic to Australia. It was described in 2012 by Australian entomologists Michael Batley and Terry Houston.

== Etymology ==
The specific epithet brachytomus (Latin: 'clipped') refers to the hair on the supraclypeal area on the faces of the males.

== Description ==
The body length is about 12–13 mm. The eyes are hairy. Colouration is mainly black, red and dark to orange-brown, and with white and orange hair. The metasoma is red with indistinct, narrow gold bands.

== Distribution and habitat ==
The species occurs in South Australia and far western New South Wales. The type locality is 30 km west of Orroroo, South Australia.

== Behaviour ==
The adults are flying mellivores.

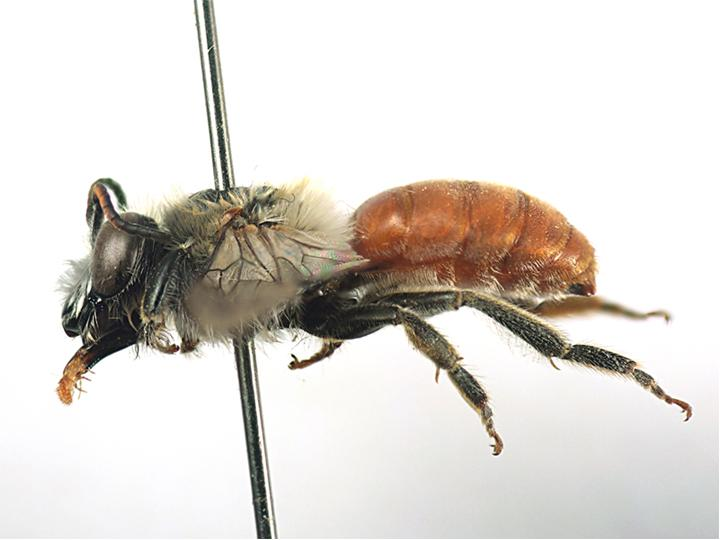
Male
