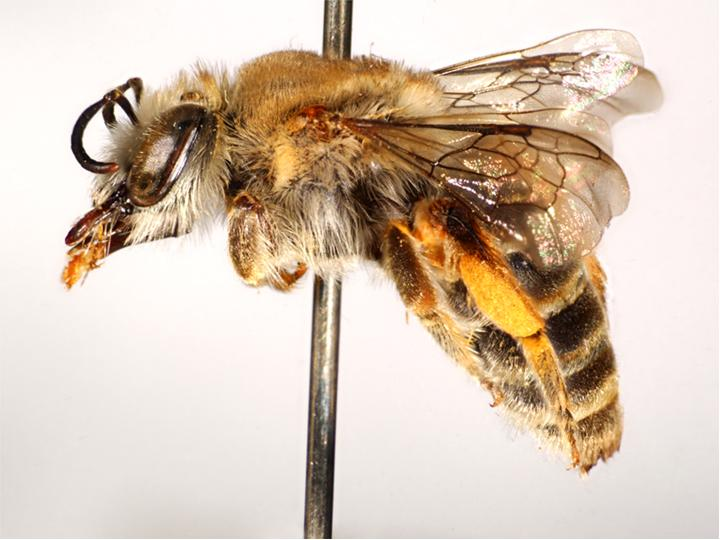
- Female

Scientific classification
- Kingdom: Animalia
- Phylum: Arthropoda
- Clade: Pancrustacea
- Class: Insecta
- Order: Hymenoptera
- Family: Colletidae
- Genus: Trichocolletes
- Species: T. brunilabrum

Binomial name
- Trichocolletes brunilabrum Batley & Houston, 2012

= Trichocolletes brunilabrum =

Species of bee

Trichocolletes brunilabrum is a species of bee in the family Colletidae and the subfamily Colletinae. It is endemic to Australia. It was described in 2012 by Australian entomologists Michael Batley and Terry Houston.

== Description ==
The body length is about 11 mm. The eyes are hairy. Colouration is mainly black, brown to orange-brown and amber, with broad silver metasomal bands, and with white to pale orange-brown hair.

== Distribution and habitat ==
The species occurs mainly in arid areas of Western Australia east of Shark Bay. The type locality is 7 km north of Wongawol Homestead, near Wiluna.

== Behaviour ==
The adults are flying mellivores. Flowering plants visited by the bees include Indigofera georgei and Swainsona species.

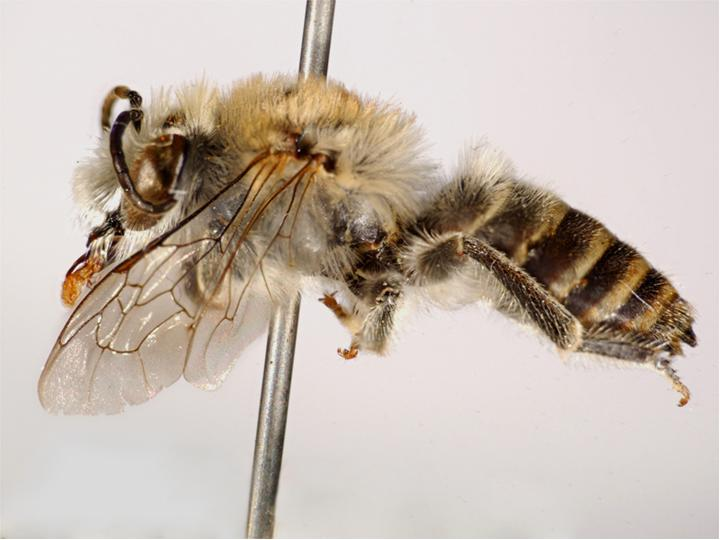
Male
