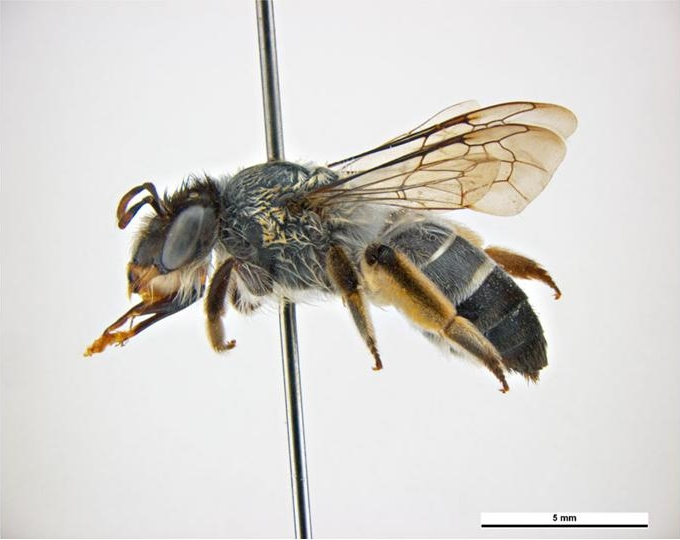
- Female

Scientific classification
- Kingdom: Animalia
- Phylum: Arthropoda
- Clade: Pancrustacea
- Class: Insecta
- Order: Hymenoptera
- Family: Colletidae
- Genus: Trichocolletes
- Species: T. eremophilae

Binomial name
- Trichocolletes eremophilae Houston, 1990

= Trichocolletes eremophilae =

Species of bee

Trichocolletes eremophilae is a species of bee in the family Colletidae and the subfamily Colletinae. It is endemic to Australia. It was described in 1990 by Australian entomologist Terry Houston.

== Etymology ==
The specific epithet eremophilae is derived from the generic name of the forage plants.

== Description ==
The body length is about 12–13 mm. The eyes are not hairy. Colouration is mainly black and yellow-brown.

== Distribution and habitat ==
The species occurs across much of inland southern Western Australia. The type locality is East Yuna Reserve, 34 km west-north-west of Mullewa in the Mid West region.

== Behaviour ==
The adults are flying mellivores. Flowering plants visited by the bees include Eremophila species.

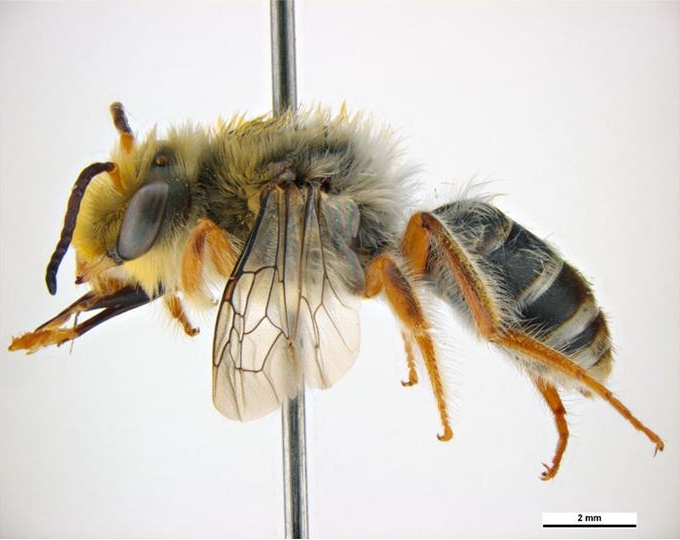
Male
