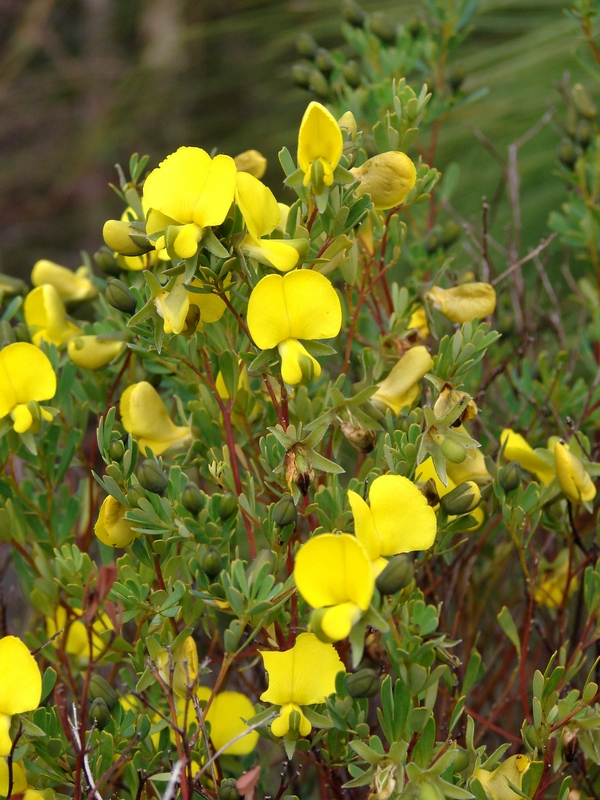
- Gompholobium virgatum in Noosa National Park

Scientific classification
- Kingdom: Plantae
- Clade: Tracheophytes
- Clade: Angiosperms
- Clade: Eudicots
- Clade: Rosids
- Order: Fabales
- Family: Fabaceae
- Subfamily: Faboideae
- Genus: Gompholobium
- Species: G. virgatum

Binomial name
- Gompholobium virgatum Sieber ex DC.

Synonyms
- Gompholobium virgatum Rchb. nom. illeg..; Gompholobium virgatum var. emarginatum F.M.Bailey; Gompholobium virgatum Sieber ex DC. var. virgatum

= Gompholobium virgatum =

Leafy wedge pea

Species of flowering plant

Gompholobium virgatum, commonly known as leafy wedge pea, is a species of flowering plant in the family Fabaceae and is endemic to eastern Australia. It is an erect or sprawling shrub with trifoliate leaves, the leaflets narrow egg-shaped with the narrower end towards the base, and yellow and greenish, pea-like flowers.

== Description ==
Gompholobium virgatum is an erect or sprawling shrub that typically grows up to 2 m (6 ft 7 in) high and 1 m (3 ft 3 in) wide. The leaves are trifoliate, the leaflets narrow egg-shaped with the narrower end towards the base, 7.5–20 mm (0.30–0.79 in) long and about 0.8–4.3 mm (0.031–0.169 in) wide with the edges curved down. The flowers are arranged singly, in pairs or threes, each flower on a pedicel 8.5 mm (0.33 in) long. The sepals are 5.2–7.2 mm (0.20–0.28 in) long, the standard petal and wings are yellow and the keel is greenish-yellow. Flowering occurs throughout the year and the fruit is an oval pod 7–10 mm (0.28–0.39 in) long.

== Taxonomy and naming ==
Gompholobium virgatum was first formally described in 1825 by Augustin Pyramus de Candolle in Prodromus Systematis Naturalis Regni Vegetabilis, from an unpublished description by Franz Sieber. The specific epithet (virgatum) means "virgate".

== Distribution and habitat ==
Leafy wedge pea grows in heathland, woodland and open forest on the coast and tablelands from southern Queensland to southern New South Wales.
