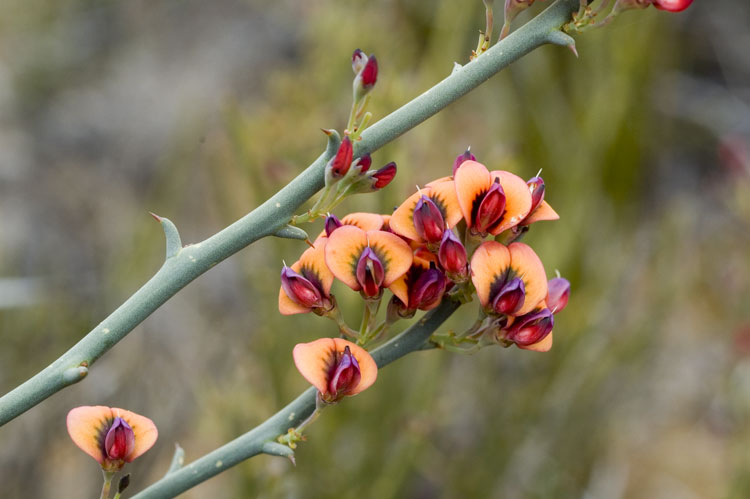
- Near Lake King

Scientific classification
- Kingdom: Plantae
- Clade: Tracheophytes
- Clade: Angiosperms
- Clade: Eudicots
- Clade: Rosids
- Order: Fabales
- Family: Fabaceae
- Subfamily: Faboideae
- Genus: Daviesia
- Species: D. aphylla

Binomial name
- Daviesia aphylla F.Muell. ex Benth.

= Daviesia aphylla =

Spiny bitter-pea

Species of flowering plant

Daviesia aphylla commonly known as spiny bitter-pea, is a species of flowering plant in the family Fabaceae and is endemic to the south-west of Western Australia. It is an erect, bushy shrub with glabrous foliage, up to six sharply-pointed phyllodes on each branchlet, and orange-red and yellow flowers.

== Description ==
Daviesia aphylla is an erect, bushy shrub that typically grows to a height of up to 2 m (6 ft 7 in) and has glabrous foliage. Its leaves are reduced to up to six rigid, sharply-pointed phyllodes up to 15 mm (0.59 in) long near the end of each branchlet, otherwise leafless. The flowers are arranged in groups of four or more in leaf axils on a peduncle 0.5–4.0 mm (0.020–0.157 in) long, each flower on a pedicel 1–7 mm (0.039–0.276 in) long with oblong bracts at the base. The sepals are 2.5–3.5 mm (0.098–0.138 in) long and joined at the base with 0.50–0.75 mm (0.020–0.030 in) long. The standard is orange-red, grading to yellow at the tips, 3–5 mm (0.12–0.20 in) long and 4.0–5.5 mm (0.16–0.22 in) wide, the wings orange-brown grading to yellow at the tip, 4.5–5.0 mm (0.18–0.20 in) long and the keel white with a purple-red tip and about 4 mm (0.16 in) long. Flowering occurs from August to October and the fruit is a broadly egg-shaped to triangular pod 5–7 mm (0.20–0.28 in) long.

== Taxonomy and naming ==
Daviesia aphylla was first formally described in 1864 by George Bentham in Flora Australiensis from and unpublished description by Ferdinand von Mueller from specimens collected near the Oldfield River by George Maxwell. The specific epithet (aphylla) means "without leaves".

== Distribution and habitat ==
This species of pea grows in heath, woodland or mallee from the wheatbelt and Goldfields–Esperance regions of Western Australia through the Murray Mallee districts of South Australia, almost as far east as the Victorian border.

== Conservation status ==
Daviesia aphylla is classified as "not threatened" by the Government of Western Australia Department of Biodiversity, Conservation and Attractions.
