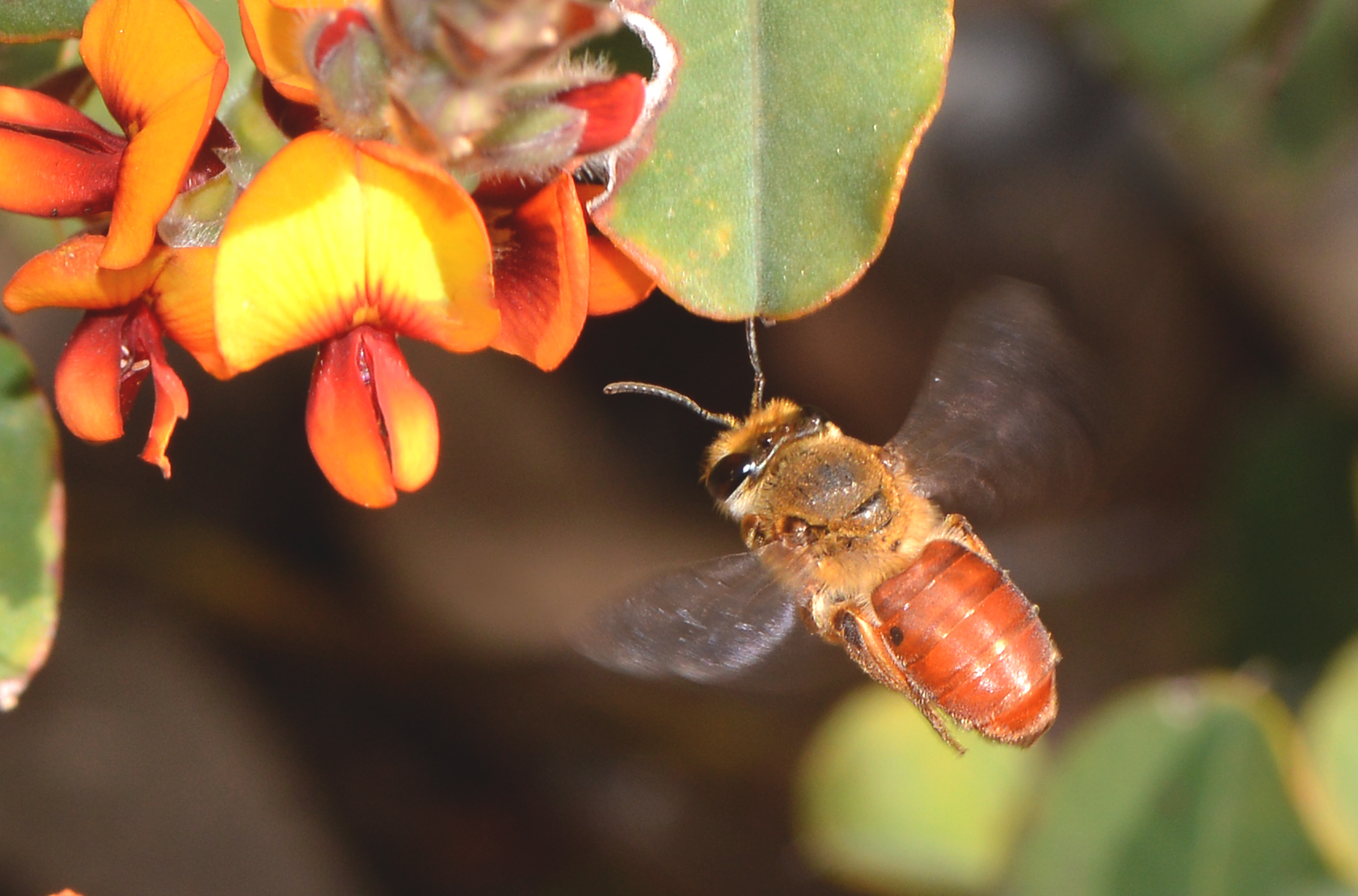
- Trichocolletes erythrurus bee visiting Gastrolobium glabratum flowers

Scientific classification
- Kingdom: Animalia
- Phylum: Arthropoda
- Clade: Pancrustacea
- Class: Insecta
- Order: Hymenoptera
- Family: Colletidae
- Genus: Trichocolletes
- Species: T. erythrurus

Binomial name
- Trichocolletes erythrurus (Cockerell, 1914)

Synonyms
- Paracolletes erythrurus Cockerell, 1914

= Trichocolletes erythrurus =

Species of bee

Trichocolletes erythrurus is a species of bee in the family Colletidae and the subfamily Colletinae. It is endemic to Australia. It was described in 1914 by British-American entomologist Theodore Dru Alison Cockerell.

== Description ==
The body length is 12 mm; the eyes are not hairy; the metasoma is reddish-brown, the bands indistinct.

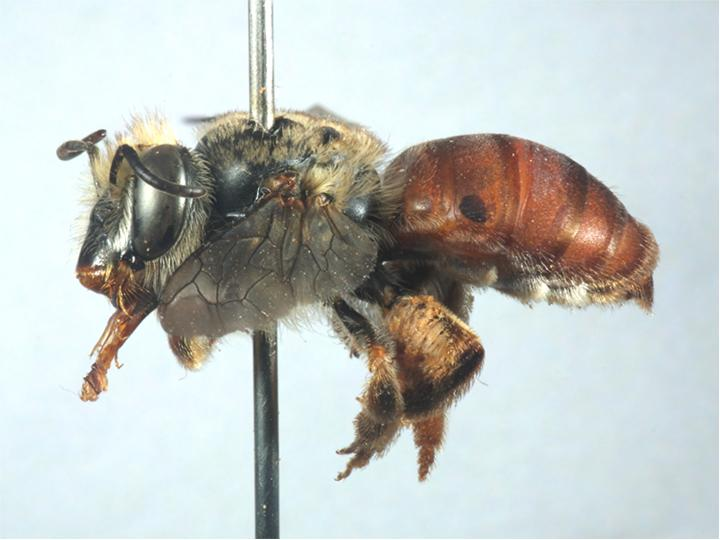
Female

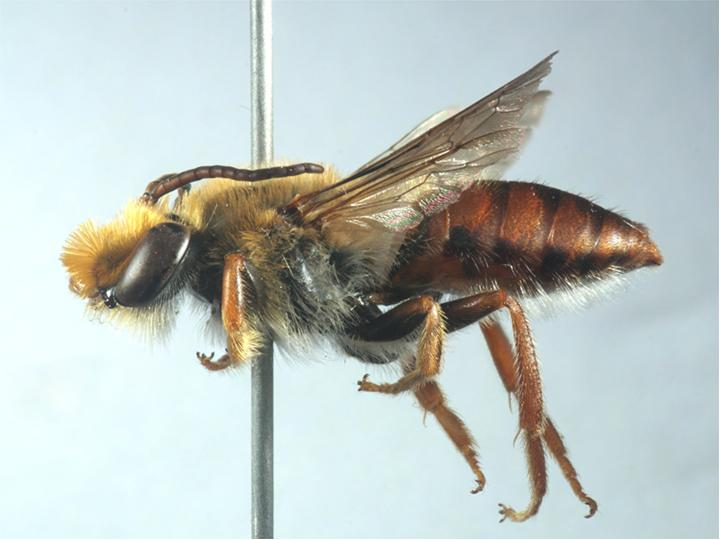
Male

== Distribution and habitat ==
The species occurs in south-west Western Australia. The type locality is Yallingup.

== Behaviour ==
The adults are flying mellivores. Flowering plants visited by the bees include Bossiaea linophylla, Chorizema dicksonii, Daviesia polyphylla, Kennedia coccinea, Gastrolobium bennettsianum, Gastrolobium calycinum, Gastrolobium parviflorum, Gastrolobium spinosum, Gompholobium confertum and Viminaria species.
