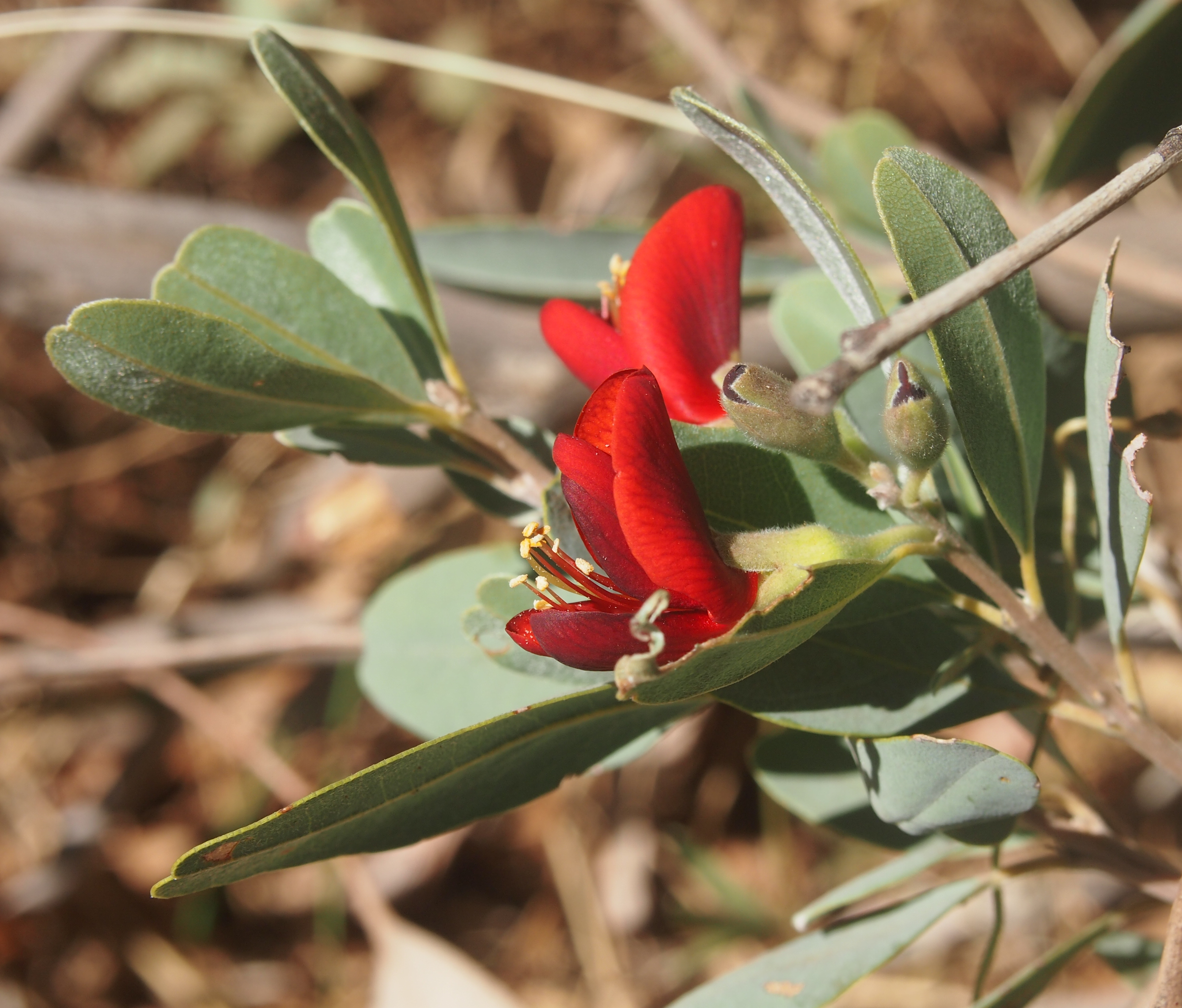

Scientific classification
- Kingdom: Plantae
- Clade: Tracheophytes
- Clade: Angiosperms
- Clade: Eudicots
- Clade: Rosids
- Order: Fabales
- Family: Fabaceae
- Subfamily: Faboideae
- Genus: Gastrolobium
- Species: G. grandiflorum

Binomial name
- Gastrolobium grandiflorum F.Muell.

= Gastrolobium grandiflorum =

Wallflower poison

Species of plant

Gastrolobium grandiflorum, commonly known as wallflower poison, wallflower poison bush or heart-leaf poison bush, is a bushy shrub which is endemic to Australia.

It grows to 2 or 3 metres in height and between late summer and early winter (February to August in Australia) it produces orange-red pea-flowers with a yellow centre and red veins. The leaves are hairy and heart-shaped on younger plants and elliptic and more glabrous on older plants, up to 6 cm long and 2.7 cm wide.

The species was first formally described by botanist Ferdinand von Mueller and published in Fragmenta Phytographiae Australiae in 1863. It is the most widespread within the genus, occurring across a large area of Queensland, as well as in the Northern Territory, Western Australia and South Australia.

== Poisonous attributes ==
The species, like many others within the genus Gastrolobium, contains high levels of fluoroacetate (the active ingredient in the pest control toxin known as 1080) The leaves, seeds and roots are highly poisonous to cattle, sheep, horses and goats. Major livestock losses have been attributed to the plant in Queensland.

In 1896, the explorer and gold prospector David Carnegie came across the plant in Western Australia on the return leg of an expedition from Coolgardie to Halls Creek later writing:

All along the banks of the creek splendid green acacia and grass was growing, and a most inviting-looking plant standing some six feet high, with greenish-grey stems and leaves, and a flower not unlike wallflower. Such a place at once suggested camping, and we were proceeding to unload when Godfrey remarked that this pretty plant was very like a most deadly Queensland poison plant; he was not sure; I had never seen it before, nor had Breaden. The risk, however, was too great; it might be poison; I could see the camels eyeing its fresh charms, and it grew in such profusion that all would be devouring it in a few minutes. So we packed up again and moved further on, much to the disgust of the blacks and the animals, for all were very tired. I collected some specimens of this plant; if Godfrey had never been in Queensland we should have been in a tight corner.

So toxic is the plant to farmed animals that, following bushfires, cattlemen in north-western Queensland have to move livestock before the heart-leaf emerges from the ashes.
