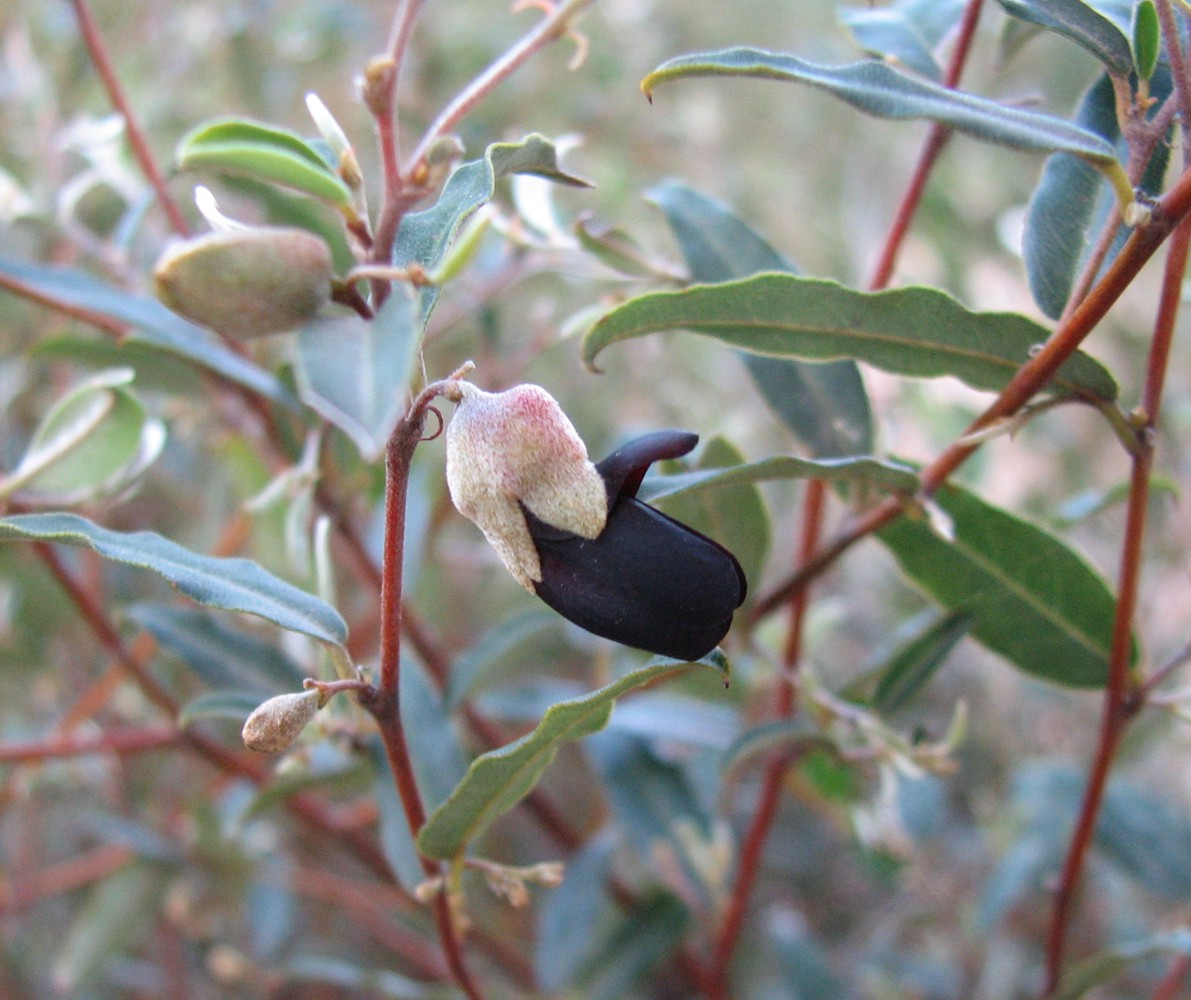

Scientific classification
- Kingdom: Plantae
- Clade: Embryophytes
- Clade: Tracheophytes
- Clade: Spermatophytes
- Clade: Angiosperms
- Clade: Eudicots
- Clade: Rosids
- Order: Fabales
- Family: Fabaceae
- Subfamily: Faboideae
- Genus: Gastrolobium
- Species: G. melanopetalum

Binomial name
- Gastrolobium melanopetalum (F.Muell.) G.Chandler & Crisp

Synonyms
- Brachysema melanopetalum F.Muell.; Brachysema sericeum var. angustifolium (Benth.) Domin; Brachysema undulatum var. angustifolium Benth.

= Gastrolobium melanopetalum =

Species of legume

Gastrolobium melanopetalum is a shrub in the family Fabaceae which is endemic to the south-west of Western Australia.

== Description ==
The species is a shrub up to 3 metres in height. It has narrow-ovate leaves which are 1.4 to 6 cm long and 0.4 to 2 cm in length. Distinctive purple-black pendulous pea-flowers are produced from early spring to early summer (September to December in Australia). It is not known whether this species shares the toxic properties of many other members of the genus Gastrolobium.

== Taxonomy ==
The species was first formally described in 1864 by botanist Ferdinand von Mueller in Fragmenta Phytographiae Australiae. He gave it the name Brachysema melanopetalum, the specific epithet being derived from the Greek words melanos (black) and petalon, alluding to the dark-coloured flowers. In 1995, botanist Michael Crisp placed the species in the genus Gastrolobium along with a number of other Brachysema species.

== Distribution ==
This species is usually found in thickets growing near streams or freshwater swamps. It occurs south of Perth between the Darling Scarp and the Blackwood River.
