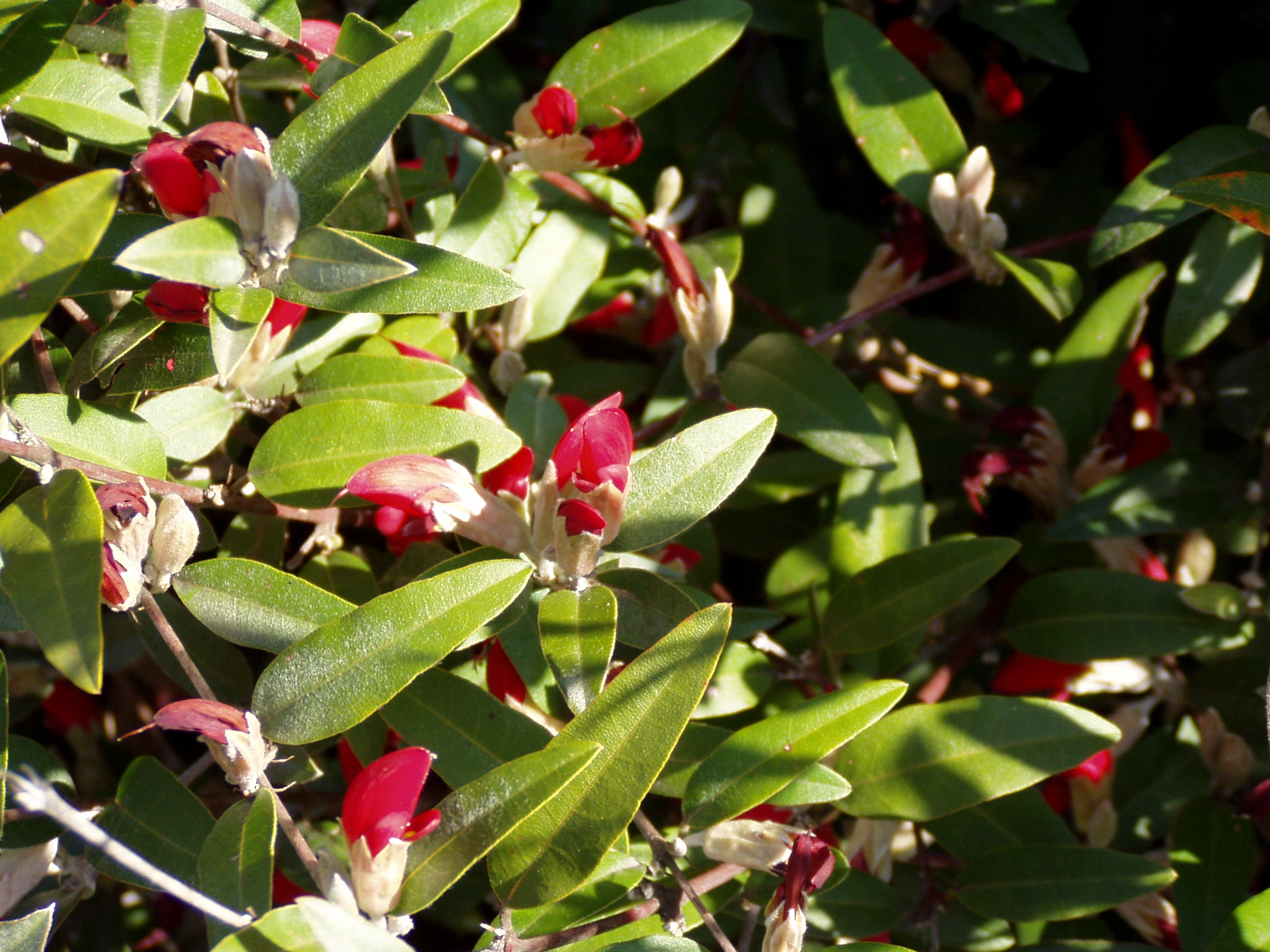
- Gastrolobium celsianum (Swan River pea)

Scientific classification
- Kingdom: Plantae
- Clade: Tracheophytes
- Clade: Angiosperms
- Clade: Eudicots
- Clade: Rosids
- Order: Fabales
- Family: Fabaceae
- Subfamily: Faboideae
- Clade: Mirbelioids
- Genus: Gastrolobium; R.Br. (1811)

Type species
- Gastrolobium bilobum R.Br.

Groups and species
- See text

Synonyms
- Brachysema R.Br. (1811); Cryptosema Meisn. (1848); Cupulanthus Hutch. (1964); Jansonia Kippist (1847); Nemcia Domin (1923); Pontania Lem. (1844)

= Gastrolobium =

Genus of plants endemic to Western Australia

Gastrolobium is a genus of flowering plants in the family Fabaceae. There are over 100 species in this genus, and all but two are native to the south west region of Western Australia.

A significant number of the species accumulate monofluoroacetate (the key ingredient of the poison known commonly as 1080), which caused introduced/non native animal deaths from the 1840s in Western Australia. The controversy over the cause of the stock poisoning in that time involved the botanist James Drummond in a series of tests to ascertain the cause of the poisoning, which was determined to be caused primarily by the plants York Road poison (G. calycinum) and Champion Bay poison (G. oxylobioides).

In the 1930s and 1940s C.A. Gardner and H.W. Bennetts identified other species in Western Australia, leading to the publication of The Toxic Plants of Western Australia in 1956.

The base chromosome number of Gastrolobium is 2n = 16.

== Species ==
Gastrolobium comprises the following species:

=== Gastrolobium bilobum Group ===
- Gastrolobium acrocaroli G. Chandler & Crisp
- Gastrolobium bilobum R.Br.—Heart-leaved poison
- Gastrolobium brevipes Crisp-Hill Wallflower Poison
- Gastrolobium callistachys Meisn.—Rock poison (Note: Gastrolobium callistachys was previously a Declared Rare Flora in Western Australia, but is not currently. See FloraBase.)
- Gastrolobium congestum G. Chandler & Crisp
- Gastrolobium cuneatum Henfry—River poison
- Gastrolobium grandiflorum F.Muell.—Wallflower poison
- Gastrolobium graniticum (S.Moore) Crisp—Granite poison (Note: Gastrolobium graniticum is a Declared Rare Flora in Western Australia. See FloraBase.)
- Gastrolobium involutum G. Chandler & Crisp
- Gastrolobium semiteres G. Chandler & Crisp
- Gastrolobium stenophyllum Turcz.—Phillips River poison, Narrow-leaved poison
- Gastrolobium tergiversum G. Chandler & Crisp

==== Gastrolobium parviflorum Subgroup ====
- Gastrolobium discolor G. Chandler, Crisp & R.J. Bayer
- Gastrolobium melanocarpum G. Chandler & Crisp
- Gastrolobium musaceum G. Chandler & Crisp
- Gastrolobium parviflorum (Benth.) Crisp—Box poison
- Gastrolobium tetragonophyllum (E.Pritz.) Crisp—Brother-brother

=== Gastrolobium calycinum Group ===
- Gastrolobium appressum C.A.Gardner—Scaleleaf poison
- Gastrolobium calycinum Benth.—York Road poison
- Gastrolobium hamulosum Meisn.—Hook Point poison (Note: Gastrolobium hamulosum is a Declared Rare Flora in Western Australia. See FloraBase.)
- Gastrolobium oxylobioides Benth.—Champion Bay poison
- Gastrolobium racemosum (Turcz.) Crisp—Net-leaved poison
- Gastrolobium reflexum G. Chandler & Crisp
- Gastrolobium rigidum (C.A.Gardner) Crisp—Rigid leaf poison (Note: Gastrolobium rigidum was previously a Declared Rare Flora in Western Australia, but is not currently. See FloraBase.)
- Gastrolobium spectabile (Endl.) Crisp—Roe's poison
- Gastrolobium tenue G. Chandler & Crisp

=== Gastrolobium celsianum Group ===
- Gastrolobium bracteolosum (F. Muell.) G. Chandler & Crisp
- Gastrolobium celsianum (Lem.) G. Chandler & Crisp—Swan River pea
- Gastrolobium formosum (Kippist ex Lindl.) G. Chandler & Crisp
- Gastrolobium leakeanum Drumm.—Mountain pea
- Gastrolobium luteifolium (Domin) G. Chandler & Crisp
- Gastrolobium melanopetalum (F. Muell.) G. Chandler & Crisp
- Gastrolobium minus (Crisp) G. Chandler & Crisp
- Gastrolobium modestum (Crisp) G. Chandler & Crisp
- Gastrolobium mondurup G. Chandler & Crisp
- Gastrolobium papilio (Crisp) G. Chandler & Crisp
- Gastrolobium praemorsum (Meisn.) G. Chandler & Crisp
- Gastrolobium rubrum (Crisp) G. Chandler & Crisp
- Gastrolobium sericeum (Sm.) G. Chandler & Crisp
- Gastrolobium subcordatum (Benth.) G. Chandler & Crisp
- Gastrolobium vestitum (Domin) G. Chandler & Crisp

=== Gastrolobium cruciatum Group ===
- Gastrolobium cruciatum G. Chandler & Crisp
- Gastrolobium epacridoides Meisn.
- Gastrolobium punctatum (Turcz.) G. Chandler & Crisp
- Gastrolobium reticulatum (Meisn.) Benth.

=== Gastrolobium floribundum Group ===
- Gastrolobium crassifolium Benth.—Thick-leaved poison
- Gastrolobium diabolophyllum G. Chandler, Crisp & R.J. Bayer
- Gastrolobium floribundum S.Moore—Wodjil poison
- Gastrolobium glaucum C.A.Gardner—Spike poison (Note: Gastrolobium glaucum is a Declared Rare Flora in Western Australia. See FloraBase.)
- Gastrolobium hians G.Chandler & Crisp
- Gastrolobium laytonii Jean White—Breelya, Kite-leaved poison
- Gastrolobium microcarpum (Meisn.) Benth.—Sandplain poison
- Gastrolobium parvifolium Benth.—Berry poison
- Gastrolobium polystachyum Meisn.—Horned poison, Hill River poison
- Gastrolobium propinquum C.A.Gardner—Hutt River poison
- Gastrolobium pycnostachyum Benth.—Mount Ragged poison, Round-leaved poison (Note: Gastrolobium pycnostachyum is a Priority 2 species. See FloraBase.)
- Gastrolobium velutinum Lindl. & Paxton—White gum poison, Stirling Range poison

=== Gastrolobium heterophyllum Group ===
- Gastrolobium heterophyllum (Turcz.) Crisp—Slender poison
- Gastrolobium nutans G. Chandler & Crisp
- Gastrolobium pusillum Crisp & P.H. Weston

=== Gastrolobium ilicifolium Group ===
- Gastrolobium ilicifolium Meisn.
- Gastrolobium rhombifolium G. Chandler & Crisp
- Gastrolobium tricuspidatum Meisn.

=== Gastrolobium obovatum Group ===
- Gastrolobium bennettsianum C.A.Gardner—Cluster poison
- Gastrolobium brownii Meisn.
- Gastrolobium hookeri Meisn.
- Gastrolobium latifolium (R. Br.) G. Chandler & Crisp
- Gastrolobium obovatum Benth.
- Gastrolobium plicatum Turcz.
- Gastrolobium pulchellum Turcz.
- Gastrolobium spathulatum Benth.
- Gastrolobium stowardii S. Moore
- Gastrolobium truncatum Benth.

=== Gastrolobium pyramidale Group ===
- Gastrolobium coriaceum (Sm.) G. Chandler & Crisp
- Gastrolobium crenulatum Turcz.
- Gastrolobium pyramidale T.Moore

=== Gastrolobium retusum Group ===
- Gastrolobium acutum Benth.
- Gastrolobium alternifolium G. Chandler & Crisp
- Gastrolobium capitatum (Benth.) G. Chandler & Crisp
- Gastrolobium crispatum G. Chandler & Crisp
- Gastrolobium dorrienii (Domin) G. Chandler & Crisp
- Gastrolobium ebracteolatum G. Chandler & Crisp
- Gastrolobium effusum (M.D. Crisp & F.H. Mollemans) G. Chandler & Crisp
- Gastrolobium linearifolium G. Chandler & Crisp
- Gastrolobium nervosum (Meisn.) G. Chandler & Crisp
- Gastrolobium retusum Lindl.
- Gastrolobium stipulare Meisn.
- Gastrolobium whicherensis G. Chandler & Crisp

=== Gastrolobium spinosum Group ===
- Gastrolobium aculeatum G. Chandler, Crisp & R.J. Bayer
- Gastrolobium euryphyllum G. Chandler & Crisp
- Gastrolobium spinosum Benth.—Prickly poison
  - var. grandiflorum C.Gardner
  - var. spinosum Benth.
  - var. triangulare Benth.
  - var. trilobum S. Moore
- Gastrolobium triangulare (Benth.) Domin
- Gastrolobium trilobum Benth.—Bullock poison
- Gastrolobium wonganensis G. Chandler & Crisp

=== Gastrolobium villosum Group ===
- Gastrolobium densifolium C.A.Gardner—Mallet poison
- Gastrolobium glabratum G. Chandler & Crisp
- Gastrolobium ovalifolium Henfr.—Runner poison
- Gastrolobium rotundifolium Meisn.—Gilbernine poison
- Gastrolobium tomentosum C.A.Gardner—Woolly poison (Note: Gastrolobium tomentosum was previously a Declared Rare Flora in Western Australia, but is not currently. See FloraBase.)
- Gastrolobium villosum Benth.—Crinkle-leaved poison

=== Incertae Sedis ===
- Gastrolobium axillare Meisn.
- Gastrolobium cyanophyllum G. Chandler & Crisp
- Gastrolobium dilatatum (Benth.) G. Chandler & Crisp
- Gastrolobium elegans G. Chandler & Crisp
- Gastrolobium ferrugineum G. Chandler, Crisp & R.J. Bayer
- Gastrolobium humile G. Chandler & Crisp
- Gastrolobium lehmannii Meisn.—Cranbrook pea
- Gastrolobium nudum G. Chandler & Crisp
- Gastrolobium venulosum G. Chandler & Crisp

== Species names with uncertain taxonomic status ==
The status of the following species is unresolved:

- Gastrolobium boormani Maiden & Betche
- Gastrolobium compactum C.A. Gardner
- Gastrolobium elachistum F.Muell.
- Gastrolobium henfreyi Lem.
- Gastrolobium huegelii Henfr.
- Gastrolobium makoyanum Heynh.
- Gastrolobium revolutum Crisp
- Gastrolobium scorsifolium F.Muell.
- Gastrolobium splendens Heynh.
- Gastrolobium velutinum Lindl. ex J. Paxton
- Gastrolobium verticillatum Heynh.
- Gastrolobium whicherense G.Chandler & Crisp
- Gastrolobium wonganense G.Chandler & Crisp

== See also ==
- Western Shield Conservation Practices
