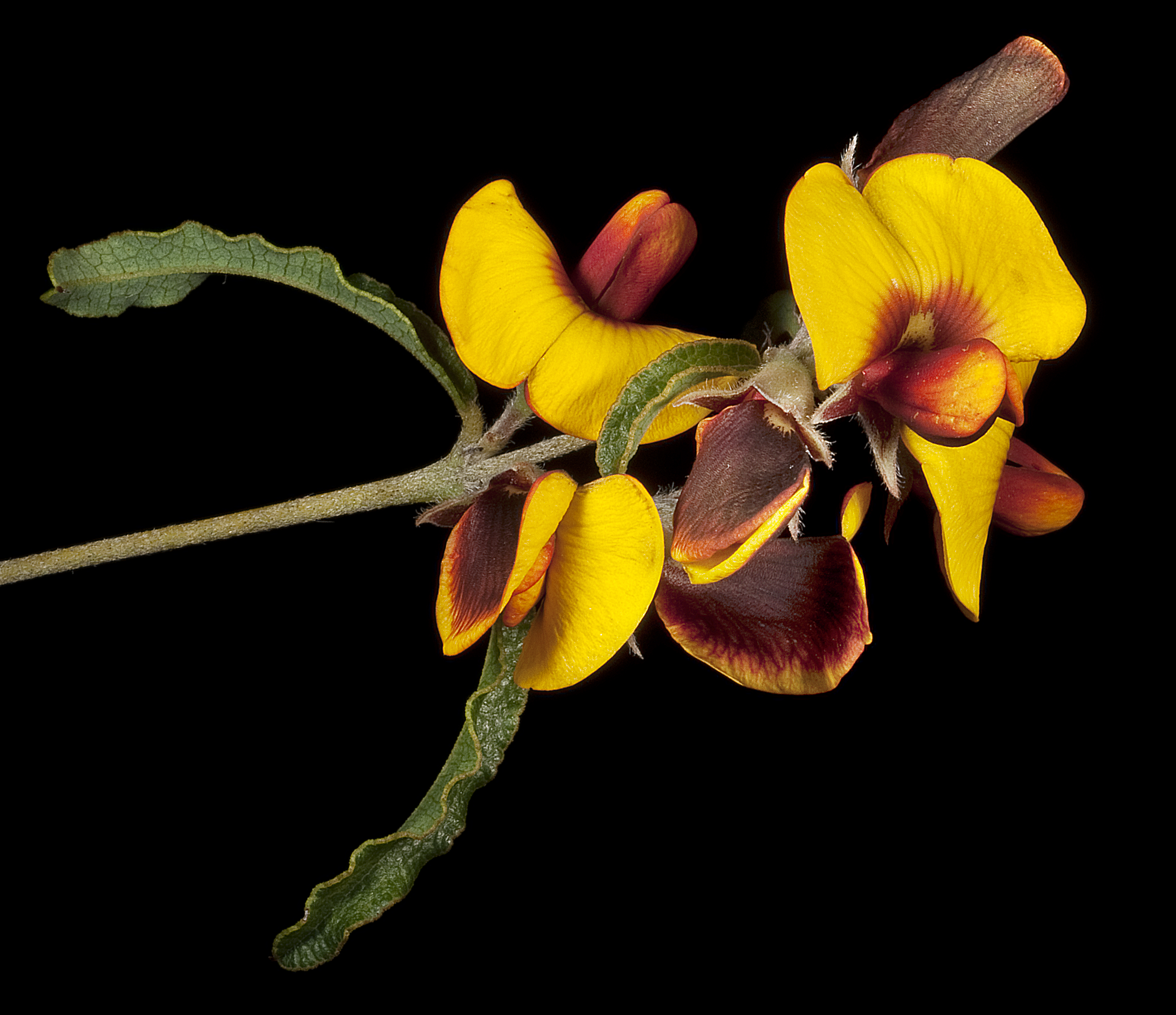

Scientific classification
- Kingdom: Plantae
- Clade: Tracheophytes
- Clade: Angiosperms
- Clade: Eudicots
- Clade: Rosids
- Order: Fabales
- Family: Fabaceae
- Subfamily: Faboideae
- Genus: Gastrolobium
- Species: G. nervosum

Binomial name
- Gastrolobium nervosum (Meisn.) G.Chandler & Crisp

Synonyms
- Oxylobium nervosum Meisn.

= Gastrolobium nervosum =

Species of plant

Gastrolobium nervosum is a small shrub in the pea family (Fabaceae), native to Western Australia.

It was first described as Oxylobium nervosum by Carl Meissner in 1855. It was transferred to the genus, Gastrolobium in 2002 by Chandler, Michael Crisp, Lindy Cayzer, and Bayer.

== Distribution & habitat ==
It is found from Kalbarri to Zuytdorp Nature Reserve, growing on sand, clay, gravel and limestone on coastal plains and sandplains.

== Etymology ==
The specific epithet, nervosum, is a Latin adjective derived from the noun, nervus ("nerve") and describes the plant as having "prominent nerves", or being "strongly nerved".
