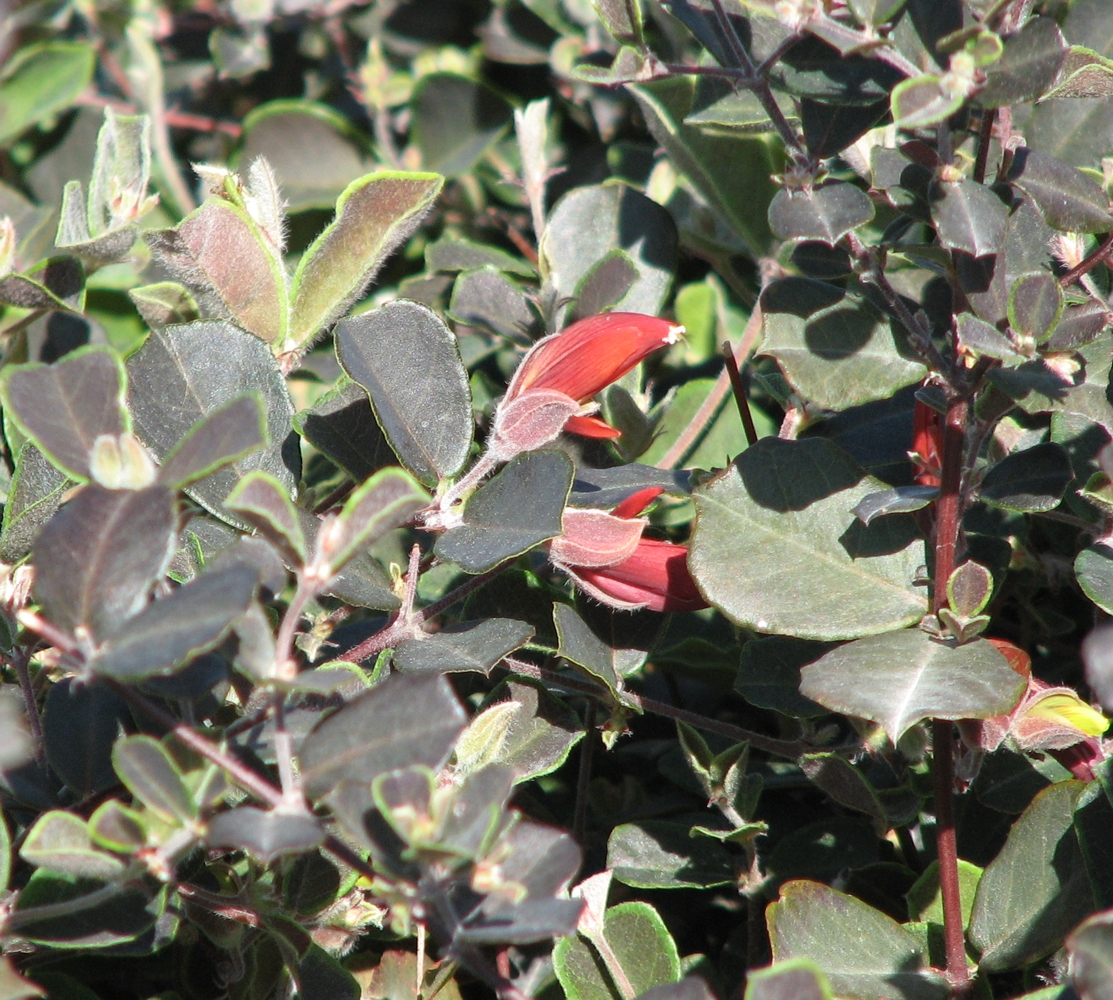
- Gastrolobium praemorsum 'BronzeButterfly'

Scientific classification
- Kingdom: Plantae
- Clade: Tracheophytes
- Clade: Angiosperms
- Clade: Eudicots
- Clade: Rosids
- Order: Fabales
- Family: Fabaceae
- Subfamily: Faboideae
- Genus: Gastrolobium
- Species: G. praemorsum

Binomial name
- Gastrolobium praemorsum (Meisn.) G.Chandler & Crisp

Synonyms
- Brachysema praemorsum Meisn.

= Gastrolobium praemorsum =

Species of legume

Gastrolobium praemorsum is a scrambling shrub which is endemic to the south-west of Western Australia. It is a member of the family Fabaceae and produces red pea-flowers from late winter to early summer (August to December in Australia). It is not known whether this species shares the toxic properties of many other members of the genus Gastrolobium.

== Taxonomy ==
The species was first formally described by botanist Carl Meissner and published in Plantae Preissianae in 1844. Meissner assigned it the name Brachysema praemorsa. In 2002 botanists Gregory Chandler and Michael Crisp reassigned this species to the genus Gastrolobium along with other Brachysema species.

== Distribution ==
It is found between Geographe Bay and Albany. An isolated population at Bullsbrook north of Perth is its northernmost occurrence.
