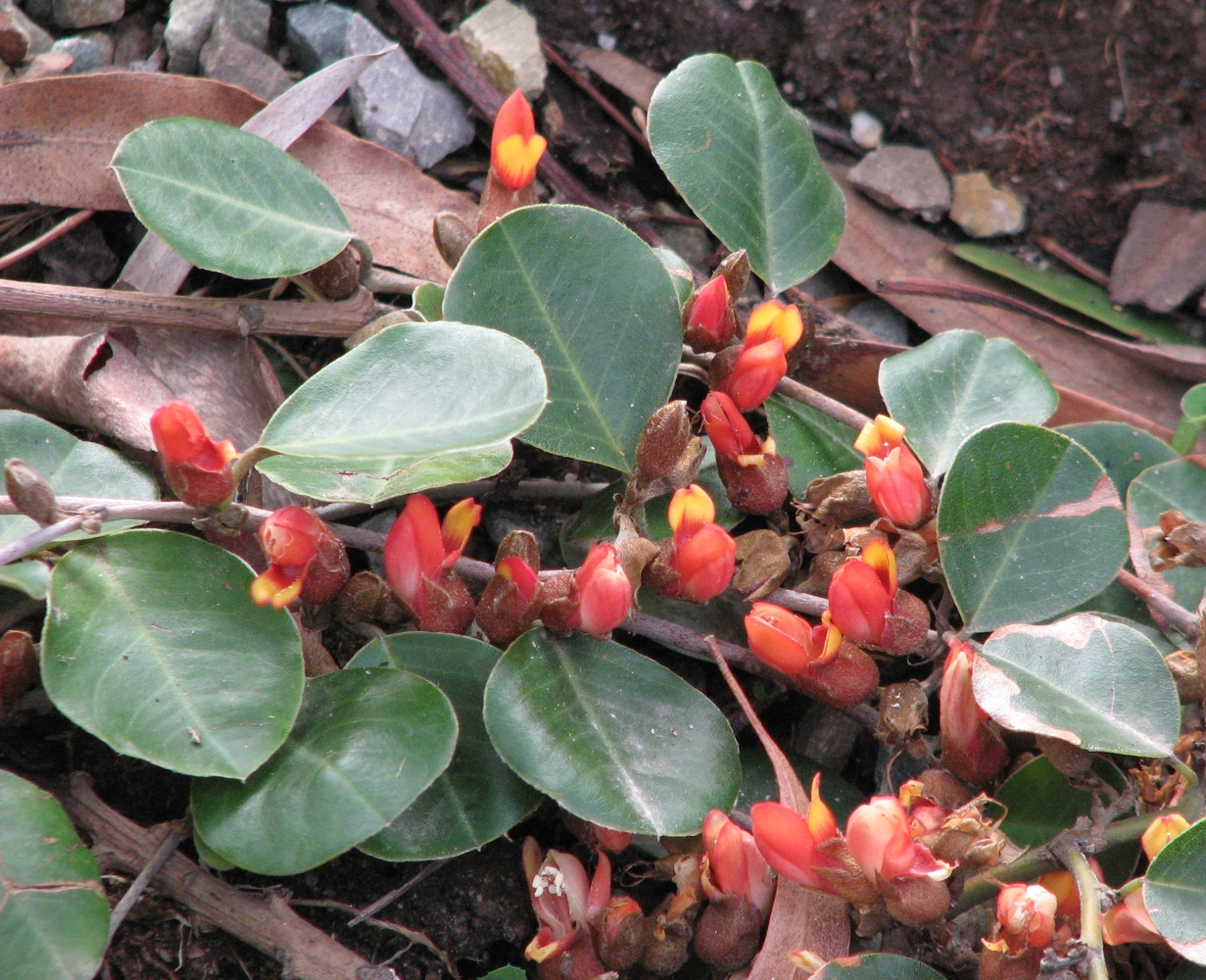

Scientific classification
- Kingdom: Plantae
- Clade: Tracheophytes
- Clade: Angiosperms
- Clade: Eudicots
- Clade: Rosids
- Order: Fabales
- Family: Fabaceae
- Subfamily: Faboideae
- Genus: Gastrolobium
- Species: G. minus

Binomial name
- Gastrolobium minus (Crisp) G.Chandler & Crisp

Synonyms
- Brachysema latifolium Hort. Brachysema minor Crisp; Brachysema sericeum Hort. Brachysema sp. 1 Cranbrook-Mt Barker (Briggs and Leigh 1989)

= Gastrolobium minus =

Broad-leaved brachysema

Species of legume

Gastrolobium minus, also known as broad-leaved brachysema, is a prostrate shrub which is endemic to the south-west of Western Australia. It is a member of the family Fabaceae and of the genus Gastrolobium, which contains many toxic species, however the toxicity of this species is unknown.

== Description ==
The plant grows to about 1 metre in diameter and has leaves that are oval in shape with a dark green upper surface and a silky undersurface. The flowers appear predominantly between July and October in the species' native range. These are orange-red with a standard that has recurved margins and yellow markings.

== Distribution and habitat ==
The species occurs in open jarrah (Eucalyptus marginata) forest near Mount Barker and Cranbrook, with an outlying population in Fitzgerald River National Park.

== Cultivation ==
The species has been popular in cultivation for many years, often distributed under the incorrect name of Brachysema latifolium. The plant may be used as a groundcover on embankments or in large containers or hanging baskets. It prefers light shade and good drainage, and is somewhat frost-tolerant.
