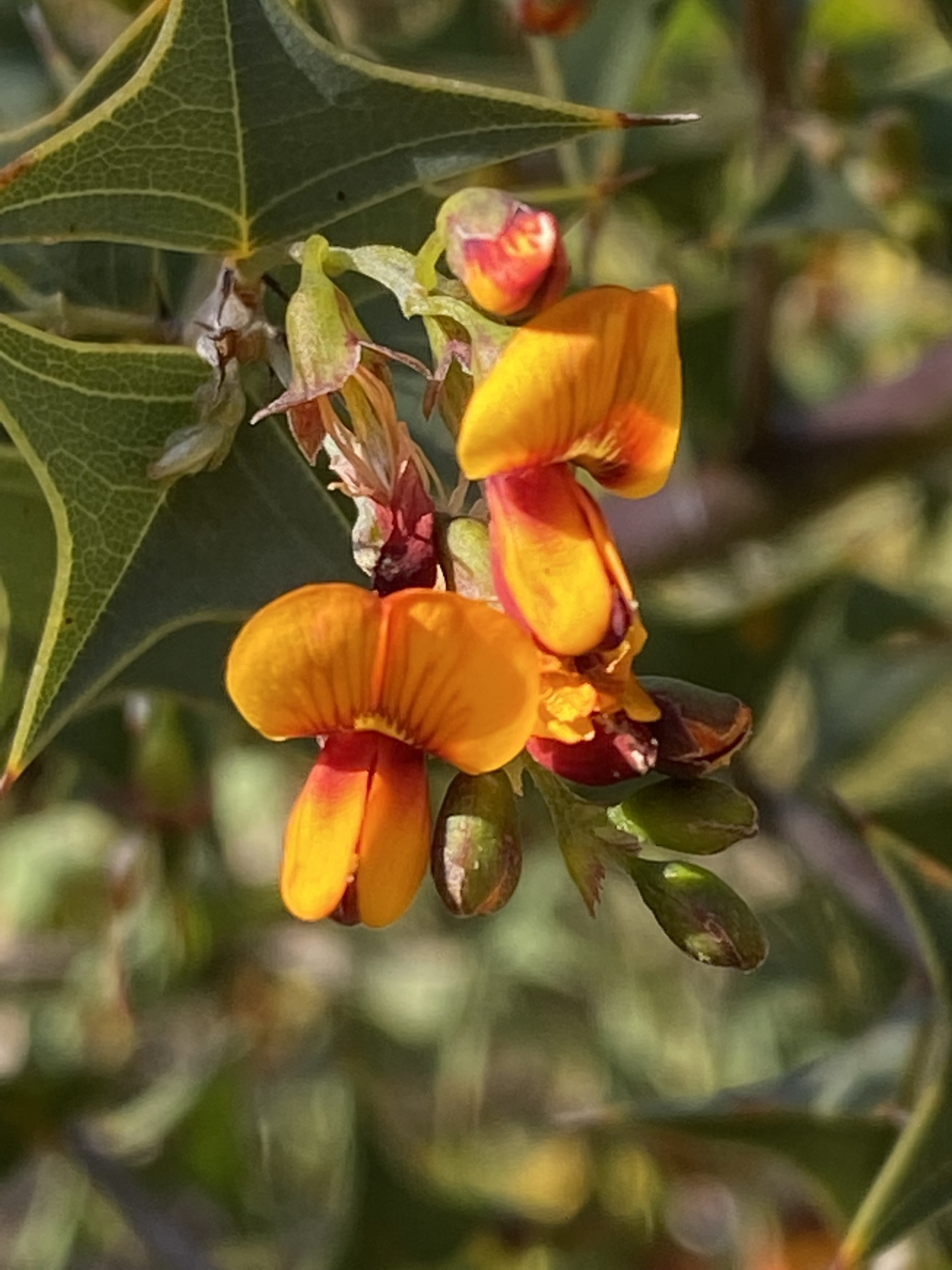

Scientific classification
- Kingdom: Plantae
- Clade: Tracheophytes
- Clade: Angiosperms
- Clade: Eudicots
- Clade: Rosids
- Order: Fabales
- Family: Fabaceae
- Subfamily: Faboideae
- Genus: Gastrolobium
- Species: G. trilobum

Binomial name
- Gastrolobium trilobum Benth. ex Lindl.

= Gastrolobium trilobum =

Bullock poison

Species of plant

Gastrolobium trilobum, commonly known as bullock poison, is a flowering plant in the family Fabaceae, and is endemic to Western Australia. It is a small, rigid shrub with orange, yellow and red flowers.

== Description ==
Gastrolobium trilobum is a spindly, spreading, prostrate shrub with needle-shaped hairy stems, some sections partly spiky. The leaves are arranged in opposite pairs, smooth, 10–35 mm (0.39–1.38 in) long, flat, margins lobed, the pedicel 1.5–2 mm (0.059–0.079 in) long and hairy. The calyx 5 mm (0.20 in) long has simple hairs and the bracteoles deciduous. The flower petals are mostly red, orange or yellow with markings in either red, yellow or orange, and the corolla is 8–9.5 mm (0.31–0.37 in) long. The standard petal is 6–7.5 mm (0.24–0.30 in) long, the wings are 9–9.5 mm (0.35–0.37 in) long and the keel 9–9.7 mm (0.35–0.38 in) long and smooth. Flowering occurs from July to November and the fruit is a pod or a follicle.

== Taxonomy and naming ==
Gastrolobium trilobum was first formally described in 1839 by John Lindley from an unpublished description by George Bentham. Lindley's description was published in A Sketch of the Vegetation of the Swan River Colony. The specific epithet (trilobum) means "lobed".

== Distribution ==
Bullock poison grows in the Avon Wheatbelt, Jarrah Forest and mallee.
