= Gastrolobium propinquum =

Scientific classification
- Kingdom: Plantae
- Clade: Tracheophytes
- Clade: Angiosperms
- Clade: Eudicots
- Clade: Rosids
- Order: Fabales
- Family: Fabaceae
- Subfamily: Faboideae
- Genus: Gastrolobium
- Species: G. propinquum

Binomial name
- Gastrolobium propinquum C.A.Gardner

Species of legume

Gastrolobium propinquum is a shrub in the family Fabaceae, endemic to the Southwest Australia savanna region, which is toxic to many animals. It has been given the common name Hutt River poison.

== Description ==
A low growing and bushy shrub, reaching 1 or 1.8 metres in height. The flowers appear from June to September in its native habitat. These are orange, yellow and red, their bracts are chestnut brown, and are held in long and slender racemes. The inflorescence extends beyond the ends of the branchlets, in an uncrowded display, and also appear at the leaf axils. The branches may be spreading, erect, or whorled, the branchlets are angled. Leaves appear in threes, are between 30 and 50 millimetres long, slightly folded along the central vein and finely pointed at the tip.

This species can only be distinguished from its near relation, Gastrolobium oxylobioides, when the species are in flower.

== Taxonomy ==
The species was formally described in 1955 by the state's botanist C.A.Gardner in New Species of Toxic Plants from Western Australia, published in The Western Australian Naturalist. The epithet of the botanical name is from the Latin propinquus (closely connected), is a reference to the close relationship of the species with Gastrolobium oxylobioides.

== Distribution ==
This species is usually found along hills and flats, favouring drainage and seasonally wet areas. Soil types are usually clay, sandy or clay-loam, and occurrence in granite and shale. It is known to occur in two regions, specimen collections have been made in the Avon Wheatbelt and in the Geraldton Sandplains to the west.
