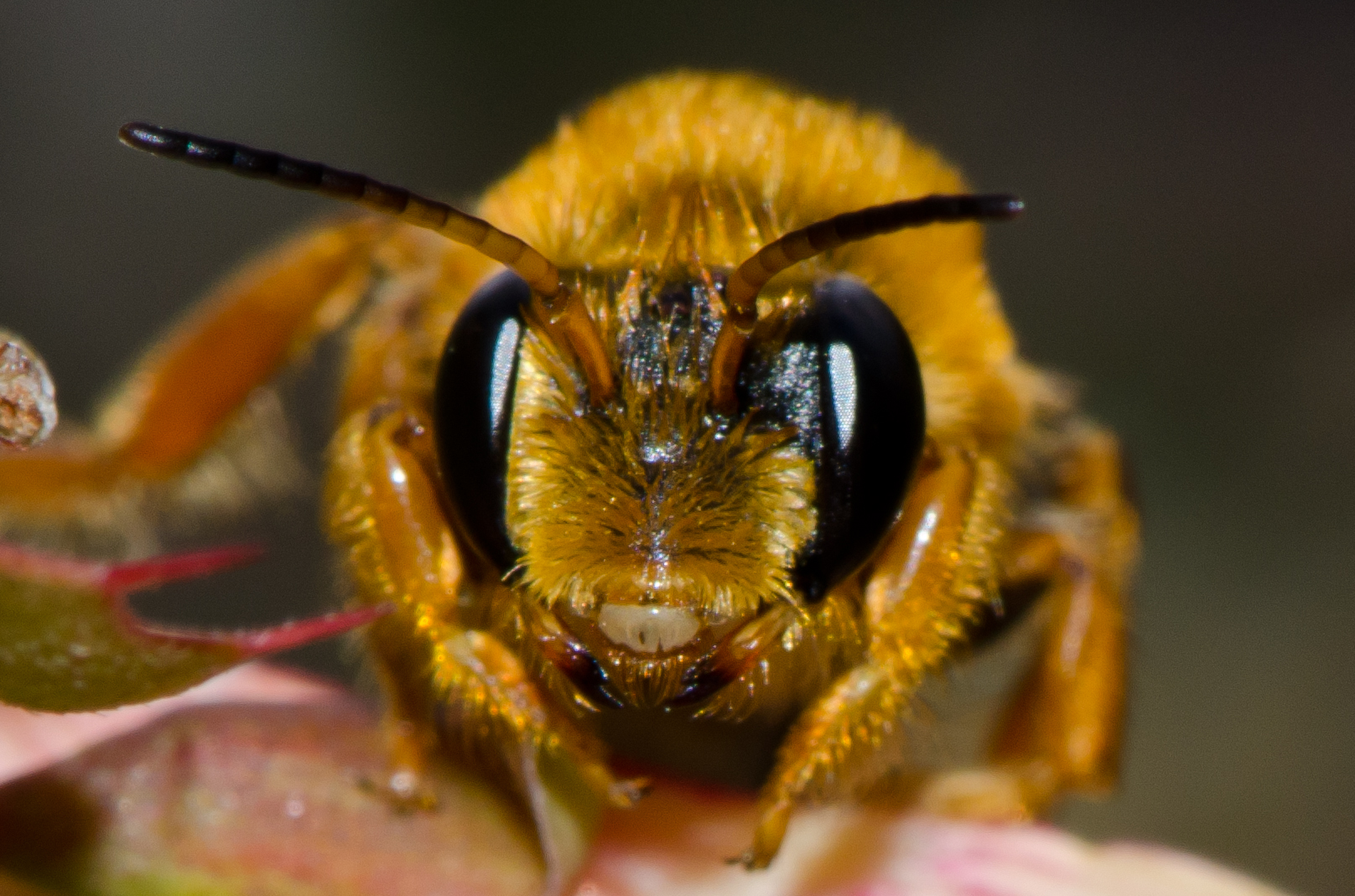
- Trichocolletes sp.

Scientific classification
- Kingdom: Animalia
- Phylum: Arthropoda
- Clade: Pancrustacea
- Class: Insecta
- Order: Hymenoptera
- Infraorder: Aculeata
- Superfamily: Apoidea
- Clade: Anthophila
- Family: Colletidae
- Genus: Trichocolletes; Cockerell, 1912

= Trichocolletes =

Genus of bees

Trichocolletes is a genus of bees in the family Colletidae and the subfamily Colletinae. It is endemic to Australia. It was described in 1912 by British-American entomologist Theodore Dru Alison Cockerell, and extensively revised in 2012 by Australian entomologists Michael Batley and Terry Houston.

== Species ==
As of 2026 the genus contained 40 valid species.

See: List of Trichocolletes species

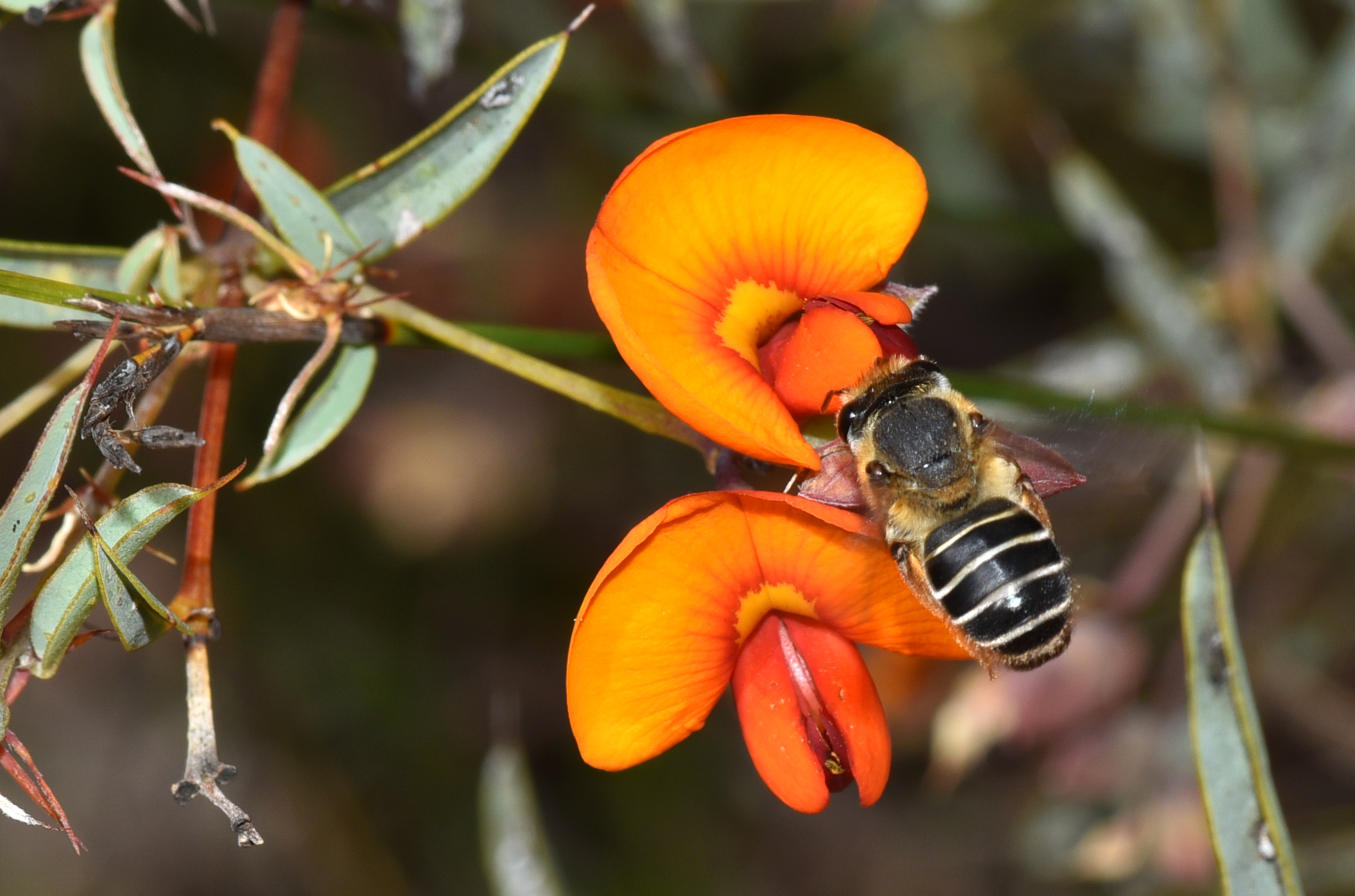
Gastrolobium calycinum (York Road Poison) flowers with Trichocolletes bee

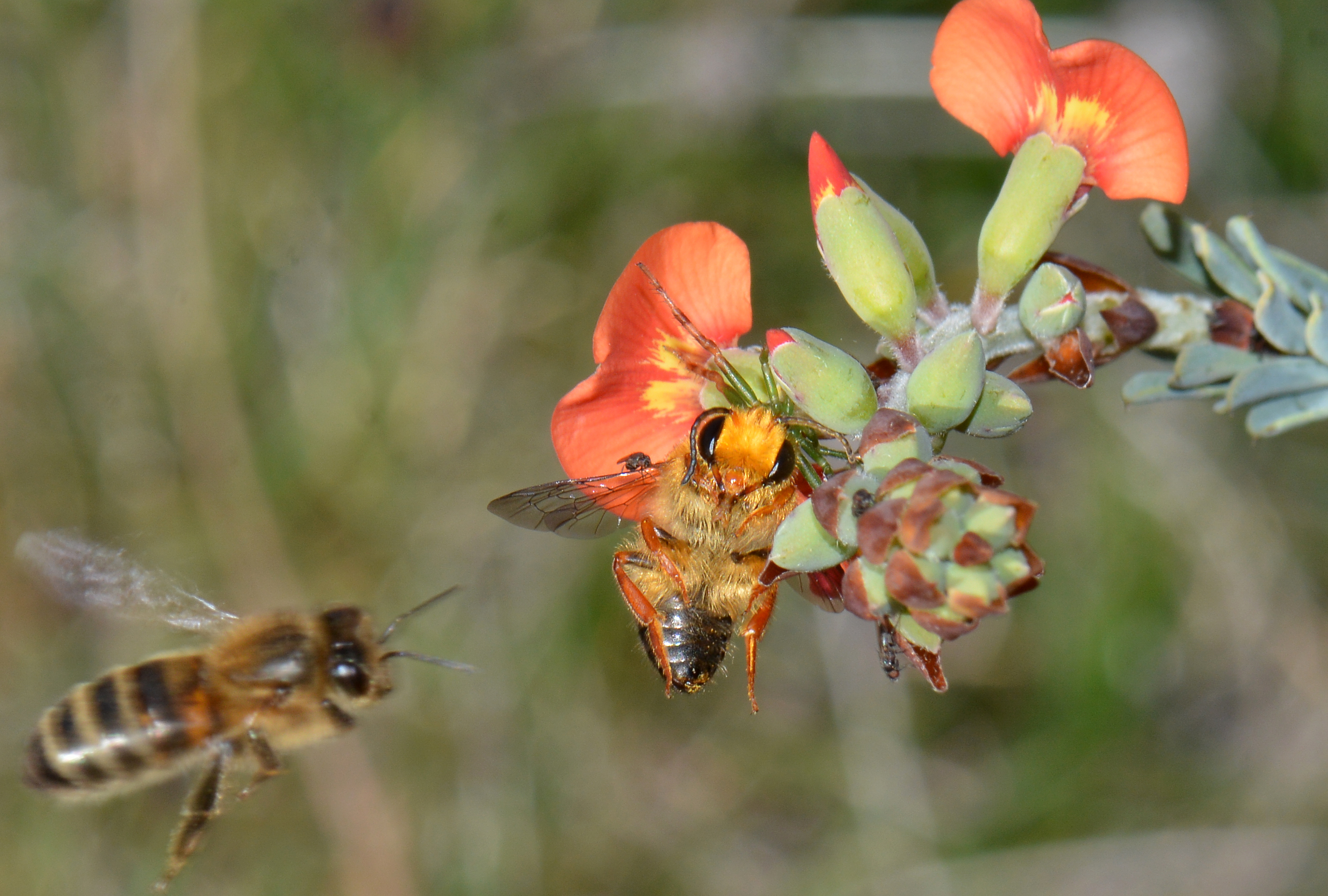
Trichocolletes bees visiting flowers, with one caught by a crab spider
