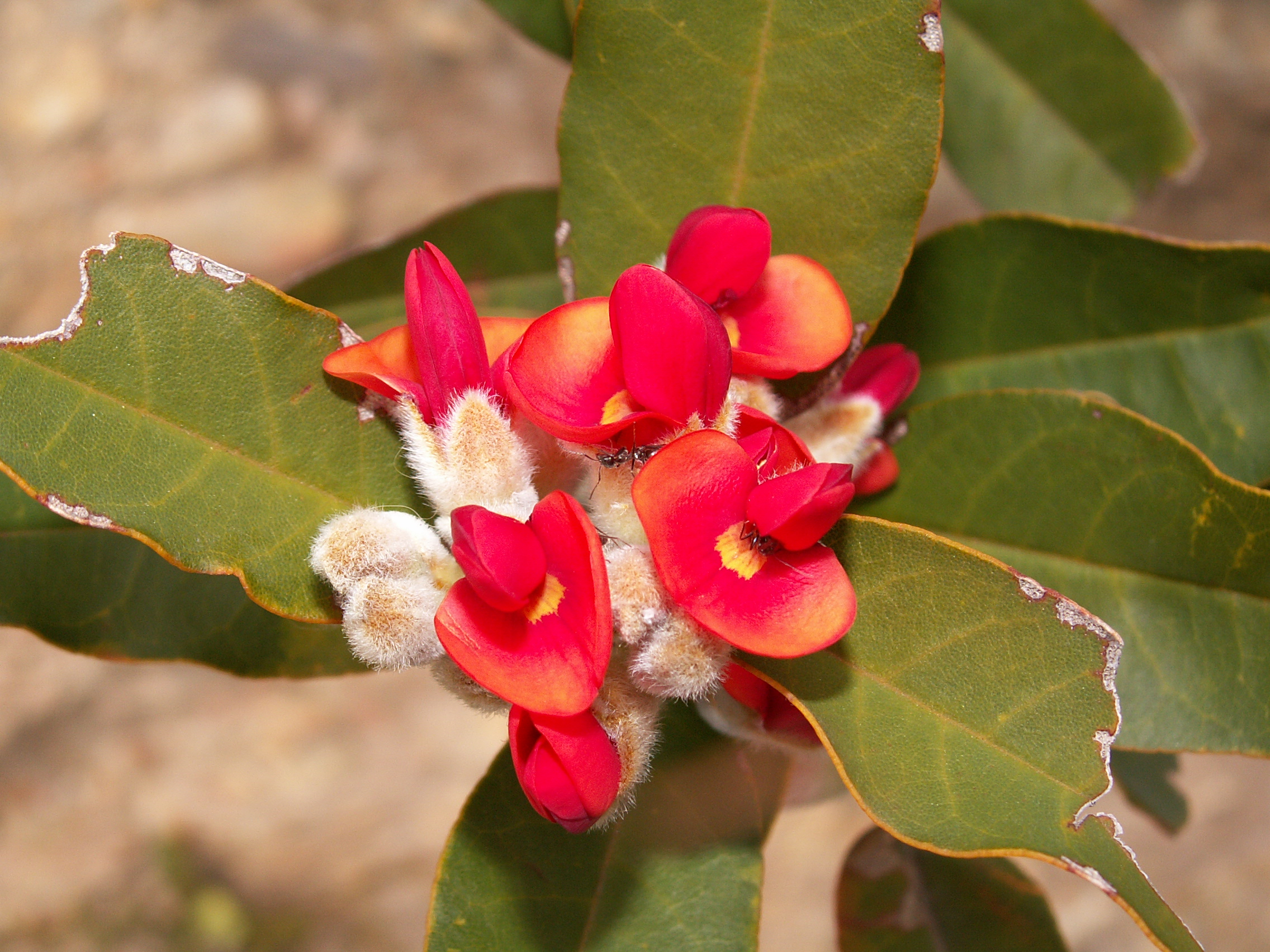
- Gastrolobium leakeanum on Bluff Knoll

Conservation status
- Priority Two — Poorly Known Taxa (DEC)

Scientific classification
- Kingdom: Plantae
- Clade: Tracheophytes
- Clade: Angiosperms
- Clade: Eudicots
- Clade: Rosids
- Order: Fabales
- Family: Fabaceae
- Subfamily: Faboideae
- Genus: Gastrolobium
- Species: G. leakeanum

Binomial name
- Gastrolobium leakeanum J.Drumm.

Synonyms
- List of synonyms: Callistachys atropurpureum Kuntze orth. var.; Callistachys atropurpureus (Turcz.) Kuntze; Nemcia atropurpurea (Turcz.) Domin; Nemcia atropurpurea Domin nom. inval., nom. nud.; Nemcia atropurpurea (Turcz.) Domin var. atropurpurea; Nemcia atropurpurea var. typica Domin nom. inval.; Nemcia leakeana (J.Drumm.) Crisp; Oxylobium atropurpureum Turcz.

= Gastrolobium leakeanum =

Mountain pea

Species of legume

Gastrolobium leakeanum, commonly known as the mountain pea, is a plant in the pea family Fabaceae that is endemic to a small area in the south-west of Western Australia. It is an erect or sprawling shrub to about 2 m (6 ft 7 in) high, with red to orange or yellow flowers in spring.

== Description ==
Gastrolobium leakeanum was described by James Drummond as being "twelve to fifteen feet (3.7–4.6m) high with opposite leaves three inches long (76mm) by two broad (51mm) and bears clusters of large deep scarlet flowers in the axils of the leaves".

== Taxonomy and naming ==
Gastrolobium leakeanum is one of about 100 species of Gastrolobium. It was first described by James Drummond in the Perth newspaper, The Inquirer on 6 December 1848. Drummond was a prolific contributor to Perth newspapers. The species was subsequently described in William Hooker's Journal of Botany and Kew Garden Miscellany. The specific epithet (leakeanum) refers to Mr George Leake, a leading member of Perth society and husband of the botanical illustrator, Georgiana Leake.

== Distribution and habitat ==
Mountain pea grows on mountaintops, ridges and steep slopes in sandy clay or loam over quartzite or in stony soils. It is found in the Esperance Plains and Mallee biogeographic regions of Western Australia.

== Conservation status ==
This species is classified as "Priority Two" by the Western Australian Government Department of Parks and Wildlife meaning that it is poorly known and from only one or a few locations. It has been shown in glasshouse experiments to be susceptible to the fungus Phytophthora cinnamomi.

== Use in horticulture ==
As with other members of its genus, G. leakeanum has been avoided in cultivation, probably because of the poisonous components in its foliage.
