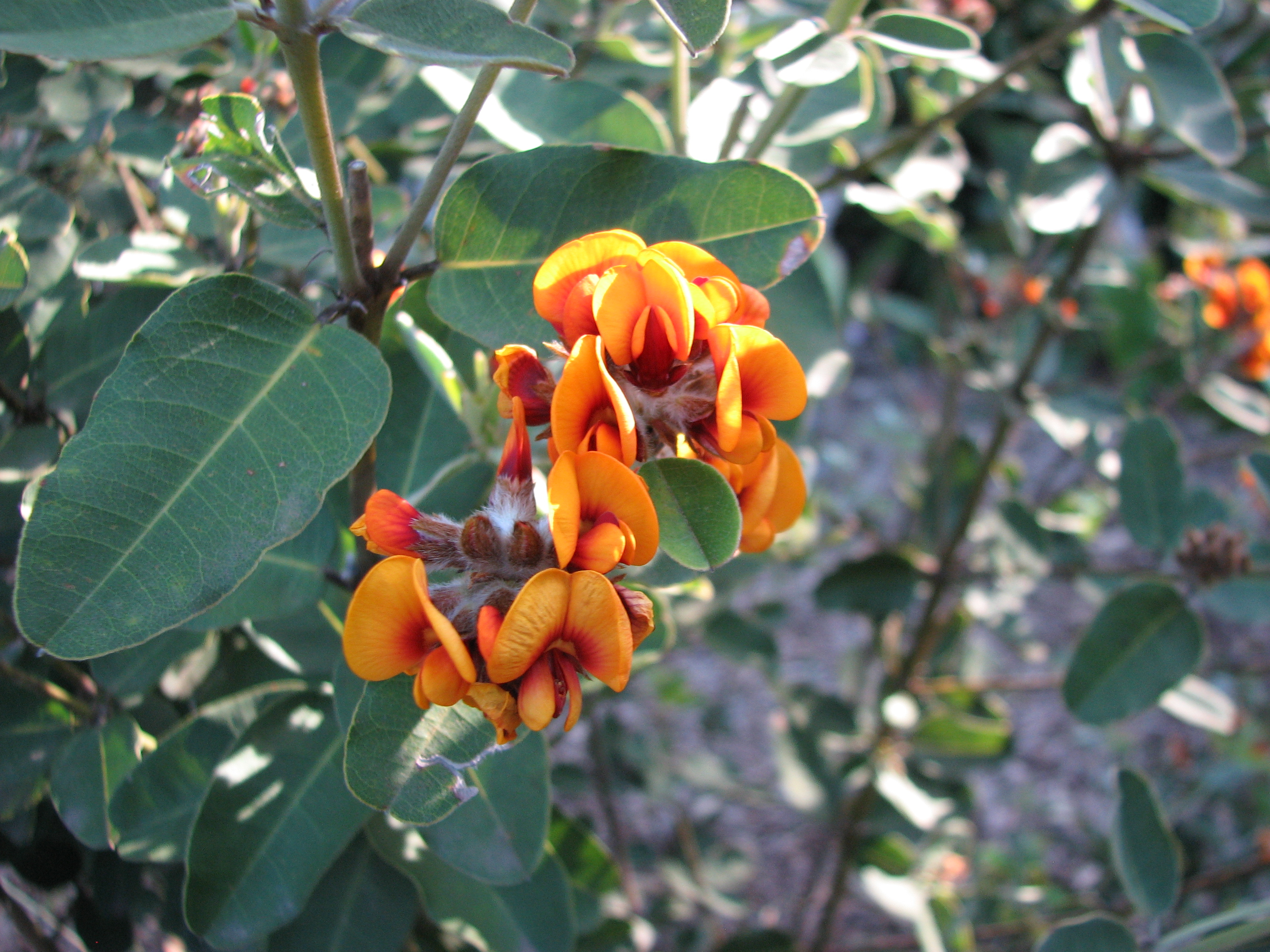

Scientific classification
- Kingdom: Plantae
- Clade: Tracheophytes
- Clade: Angiosperms
- Clade: Eudicots
- Clade: Rosids
- Order: Fabales
- Family: Fabaceae
- Subfamily: Faboideae
- Genus: Gastrolobium
- Species: G. coriaceum

Binomial name
- Gastrolobium coriaceum (Sm.) G.Chandler & Crisp

Synonyms
- Callistachys tetragona Turcz. Callistachys coriacea (Sm.) Kuntze; Callistachys ovalifolia (Meisn.) Siebert & Voss; Chorizema coriaceum Sm. Oxylobium capitatum var. ternifolium Meisn. Oxylobium coriaceum (Sm.) C.A.Gardner; Oxylobium ovalifolium Meisn; Nemcia coriacea (Sm.) Domin; Podolobium coriaceum (Sm.) DC.

= Gastrolobium coriaceum =

Species of legume

Gastrolobium coriaceum is a shrub species in the family Fabaceae. It is endemic to the south west of Western Australia.

The species has an upright form, growing up to 2 metres high. It produces orange flowers between September and October (spring) in the species' native range. The species is found in the area around Mount Manypeaks near Albany and eastwards along the south coast to Fitzgerald River National Park, with a separate population located to the west in the Whicher Range.
