= Gastrolobium lehmannii =

Conservation status
- Vulnerable (EPBC Act)

Scientific classification
- Kingdom: Plantae
- Clade: Tracheophytes
- Clade: Angiosperms
- Clade: Eudicots
- Clade: Rosids
- Order: Fabales
- Family: Fabaceae
- Subfamily: Faboideae
- Genus: Gastrolobium
- Species: G. lehmannii

Binomial name
- Gastrolobium lehmannii Meisn.

Synonyms
- Nemcia lehmannii F.Muell.

Species of legume

Gastrolobium lehmannii, the Cranbrook pea, is a vulnerable shrub in the family Fabaceae which is endemic to an area of Western Australia.

== Description ==
It is an erect domed shrub, growing to 1.5 metres (5 ft) high with soft hairy branches and oblong leaves. The pea blooms between September and October producing orange, yellow and red flowers.

It is not known whether this species shares the toxic properties of many other members of the genus Gastrolobium.

== Status ==
Gastrolobium lehmannii was listed as "rare" under Western Australia's Wildlife Conservation Act 1950. In 2006 the plant was listed as "vulnerable" under the Environment Protection and Biodiversity Conservation Act 1999.

== Taxonomy ==
The species was first formally described in 1844 by botanist Carl Meissner. In 1995, botanist Michael Crisp placed the species in the genus Nemcia. In 2002, Chandler et al returned it to the Gastrolobium.

== Distribution ==
It was first collected by James Drummond (botanist) in 1841, and later by Charles Gardner in 1919 between Cranbrook and the Stirling Ranges and from the Blackwood River area.

It was presumed to be extinct but found again in 2000 to 2002. Programmes have been initiated to conserve the remaining plants.
