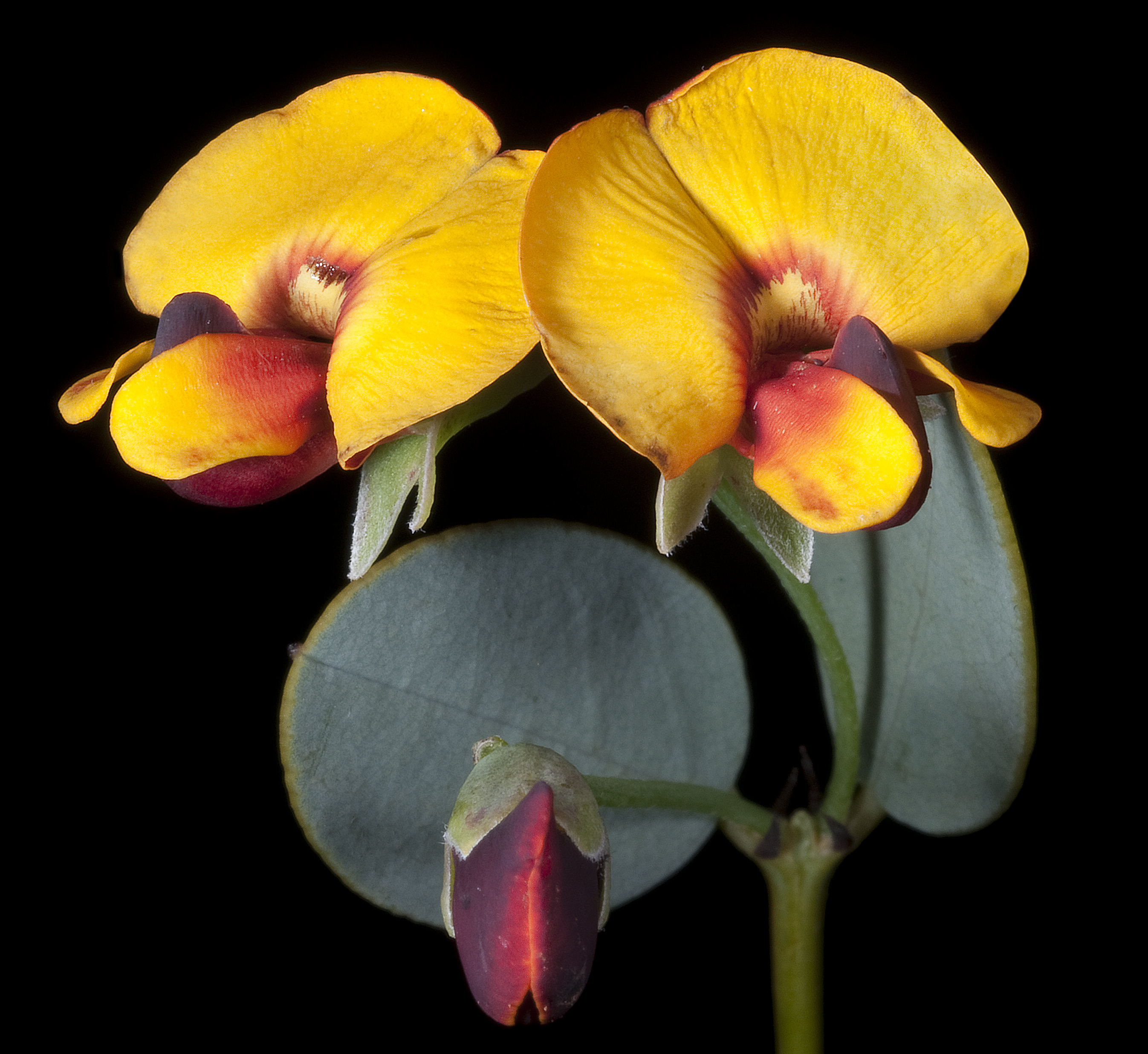

Scientific classification
- Kingdom: Plantae
- Clade: Tracheophytes
- Clade: Angiosperms
- Clade: Eudicots
- Clade: Rosids
- Order: Fabales
- Family: Fabaceae
- Subfamily: Faboideae
- Genus: Gastrolobium
- Species: G. rigidum

Binomial name
- Gastrolobium rigidum (C.A.Gardner) Crisp

Synonyms
- Oxylobium rigidum C.A.Gardner

= Gastrolobium rigidum =

Species of legume

Gastrolobium rigidum (common name rigid-leaf poison) is a small bushy shrub in the pea family (Fabaceae), native to Western Australia.

It was first described as Oxylobium rigidum by Charles Gardner in 1964. It was transferred to the genus, Gastrolobium in 1987 by Michael Crisp and Peter Weston.

== Etymology ==
The specific epithet, rigidum, is a Latin adjective derived from the verb, rigidere ("to be stiff") and describes the plant as being "stiff", or "inflexible".
