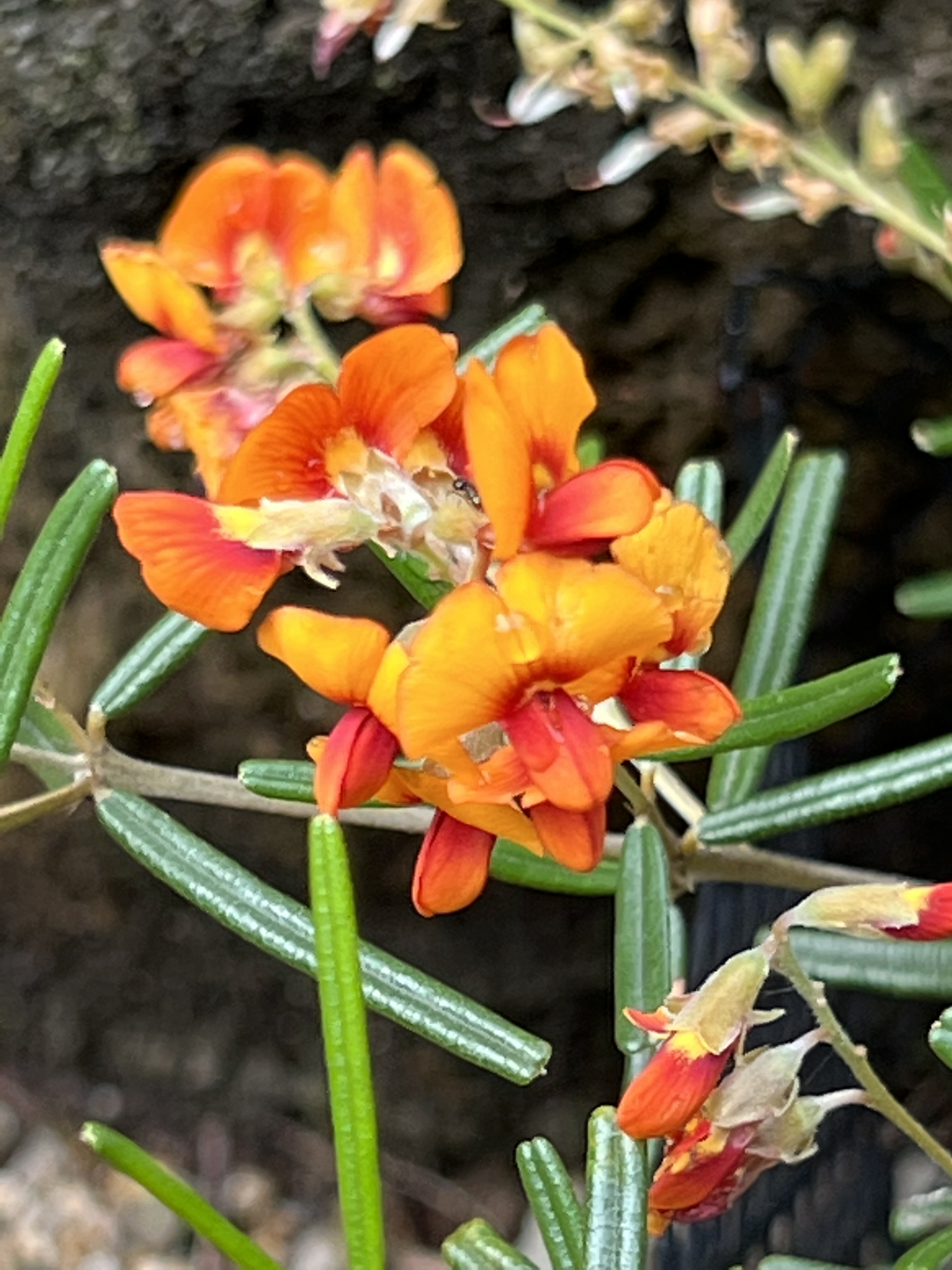

Scientific classification
- Kingdom: Plantae
- Clade: Tracheophytes
- Clade: Angiosperms
- Clade: Eudicots
- Clade: Rosids
- Order: Fabales
- Family: Fabaceae
- Subfamily: Faboideae
- Genus: Gastrolobium
- Species: G. stenophyllum

Binomial name
- Gastrolobium stenophyllum Turcz.

= Gastrolobium stenophyllum =

Narrow-leaved poison

Species of legume

Gastrolobium stenophyllum, commonly known as narrow-leaved poison, is a flowering plant in the family Fabaceae and is endemic to Western Australia. It is a bushy, upright shrub with orange, pink and red flowers. Flowering occurs from September to December or January to February. It grows at the base of outcrops, near rivers, in heath and shrubland and in sandy locations.

== Taxonomy and naming ==
Narrow-leaved poison was first formally described by Nikolai Turczaninow and the description was published in Bulletin de la Société Impériale des Naturalistes de Moscou. The specific epithet (stenophyllum) means "leaved".
