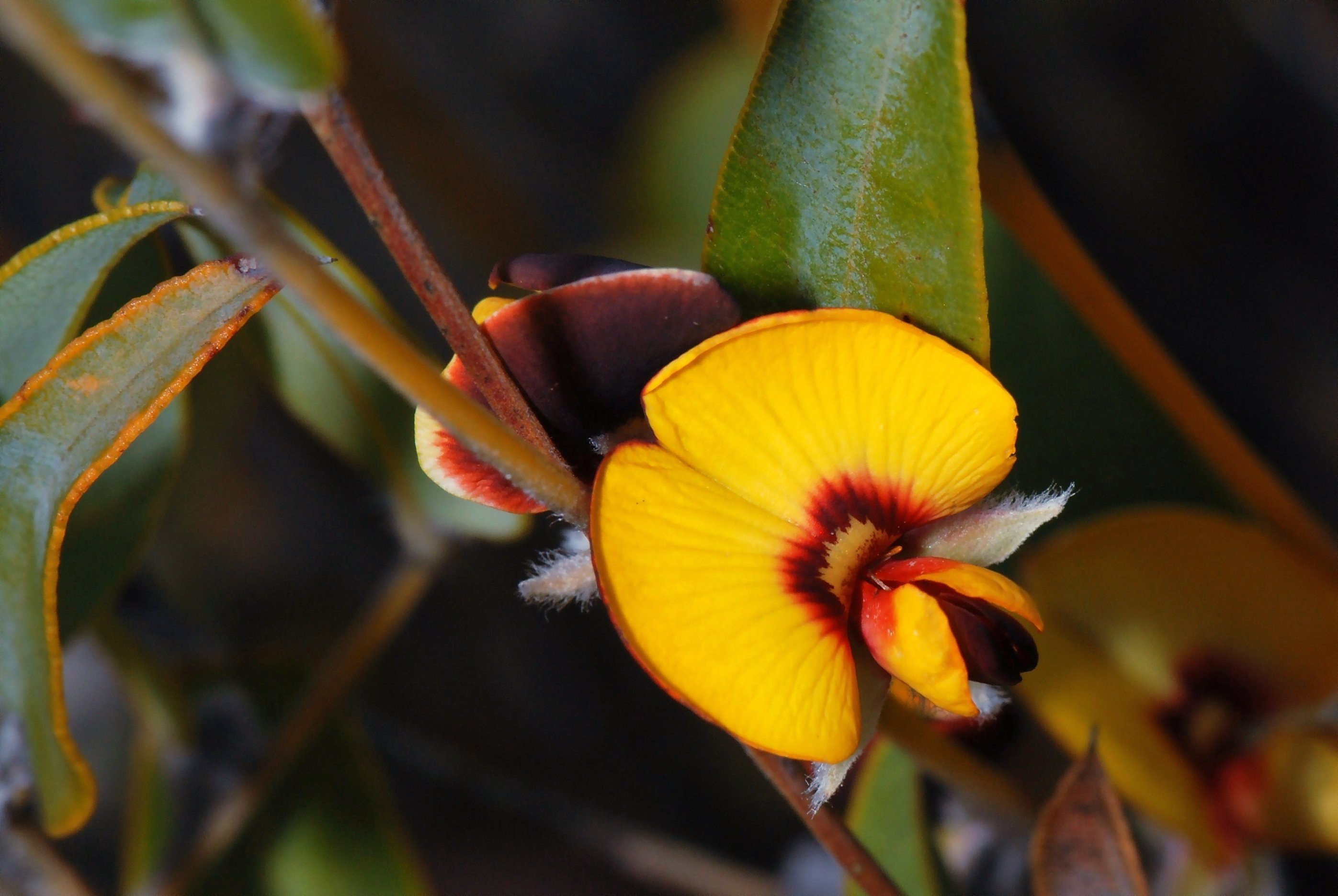

Scientific classification
- Kingdom: Plantae
- Clade: Tracheophytes
- Clade: Angiosperms
- Clade: Eudicots
- Clade: Rosids
- Order: Fabales
- Family: Fabaceae
- Subfamily: Faboideae
- Genus: Gastrolobium
- Species: G. alternifolium

Binomial name
- Gastrolobium alternifolium G.Chandler & Crisp

= Gastrolobium alternifolium =

Species of legume endemic to Western Australia

Gastrolobium alternifolium is a flowering plant in the family Fabaceae. It is a small multi-branched shrub with predominantly yellow pea flowers and is endemic to Western Australia.
