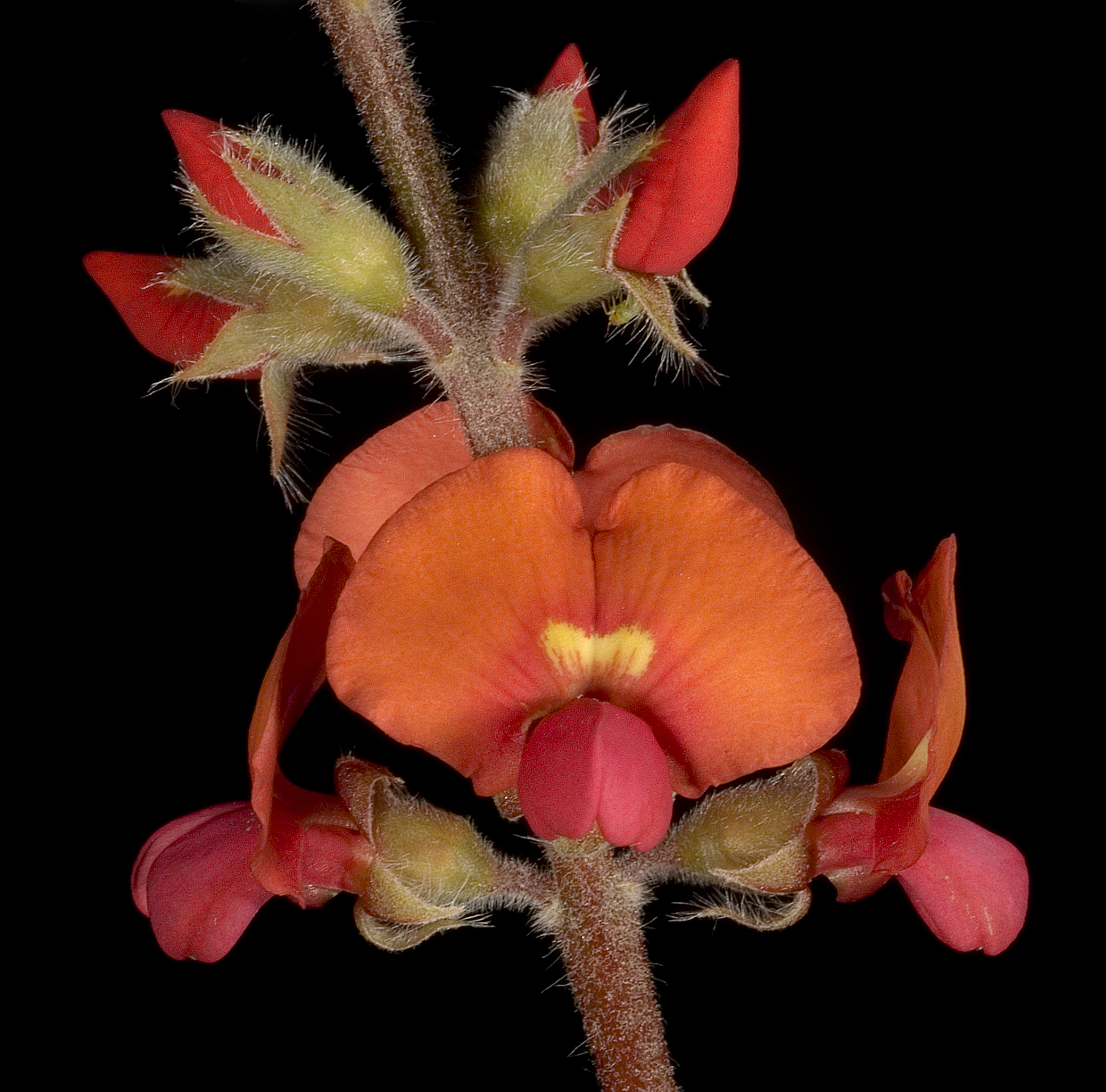

Scientific classification
- Kingdom: Plantae
- Clade: Tracheophytes
- Clade: Angiosperms
- Clade: Eudicots
- Clade: Rosids
- Order: Fabales
- Family: Fabaceae
- Subfamily: Faboideae
- Genus: Gastrolobium
- Species: G. villosum

Binomial name
- Gastrolobium villosum Benth. ex Lindl.

= Gastrolobium villosum =

Species of legume

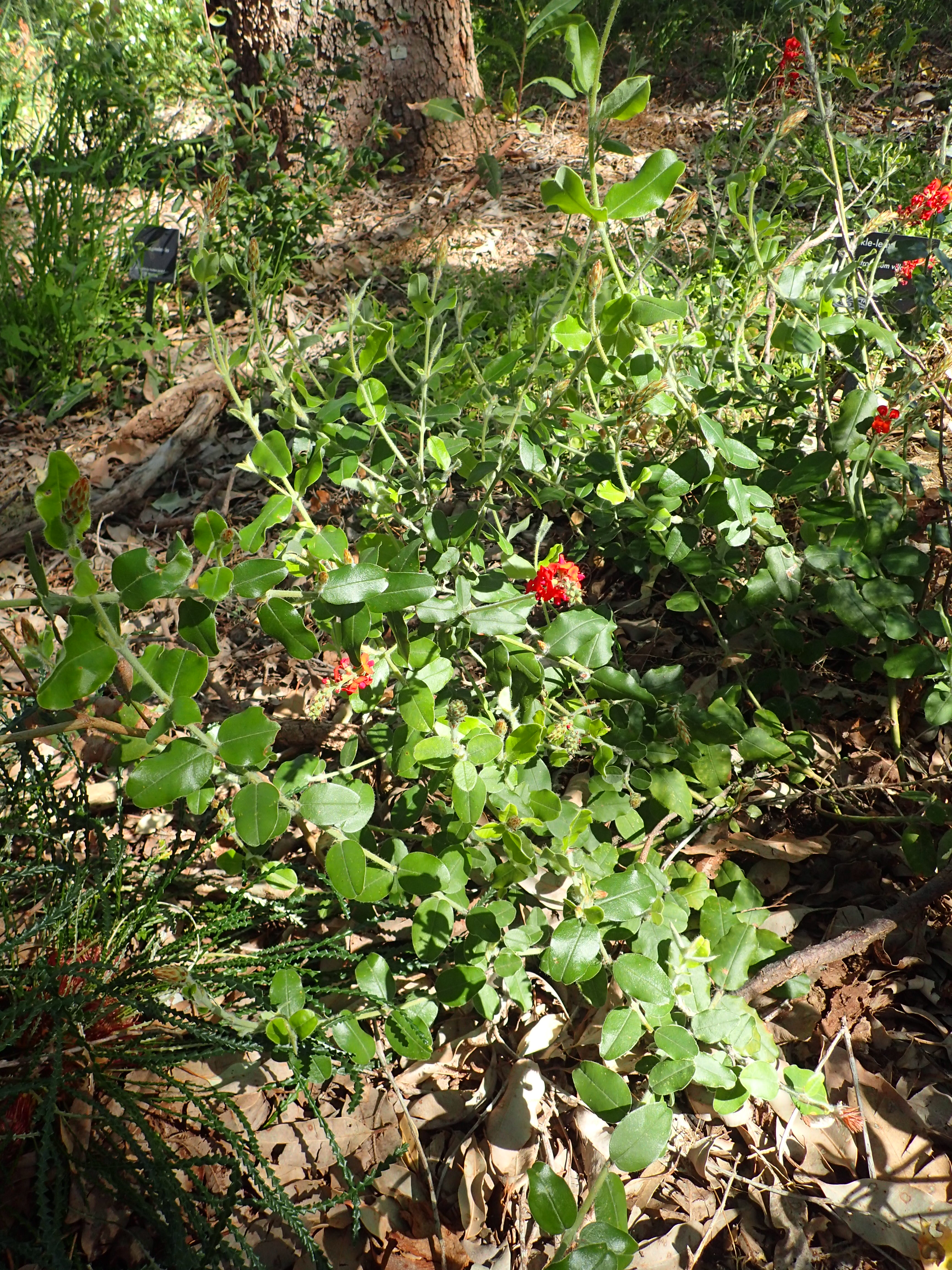
In Kings Park, Perth

Gastrolobium villosum (common name crinkle-leaf poison or crinkle-leaved poison) is a low spreading shrub in the pea family (Fabaceae), endemic to Western Australia. Like most Gastrolobiums it is poisonous to stock.

It was first described by George Bentham in 1839. There are no synonyms.

It is deemed to be "Not Threatened" under Western Australian conservation law.

== Etymology ==
The specific epithet, villosum, is a Latin adjective, villosus, -a, -um ("villous") and describes the plant as having "long, soft, straight (not interwoven) hairs".
