= Gastrolobium acrocaroli =

Scientific classification
- Kingdom: Plantae
- Clade: Tracheophytes
- Clade: Angiosperms
- Clade: Eudicots
- Clade: Rosids
- Order: Fabales
- Family: Fabaceae
- Subfamily: Faboideae
- Genus: Gastrolobium
- Species: G. acrocaroli

Binomial name
- Gastrolobium acrocaroli G.Chandler & Crisp

Species of legume endemic to Western Australia

Gastrolobium acrocaroli is an erect open shrub that is endemic to an isolated location in the south-west of Western Australia. It is a member of the family Fabaceae, grows to 2.7 metres high and produces orange yellow pea-flowers in either April or September to November.

== Taxonomy ==
The species was first formally described in 2002 botanists by Gregory Chandler and Michael Crisp and the description was published in Australian Systematic Botany. The specific epithet (acrocaroli) is derived from the Ancient Greek word akron meaning "top", "summit" or "peak" and carolus meaning "Charles", referring to Peak Charles in the Peak Charles National Park where this species is found.

== Distribution and habitat ==
It is found at Peak Charles in the IBRA Subregion of the Eastern Mallee. The habitat is on mainly skeletal soils over granite and rock outcrops, and in open shrubland or dense heath.
