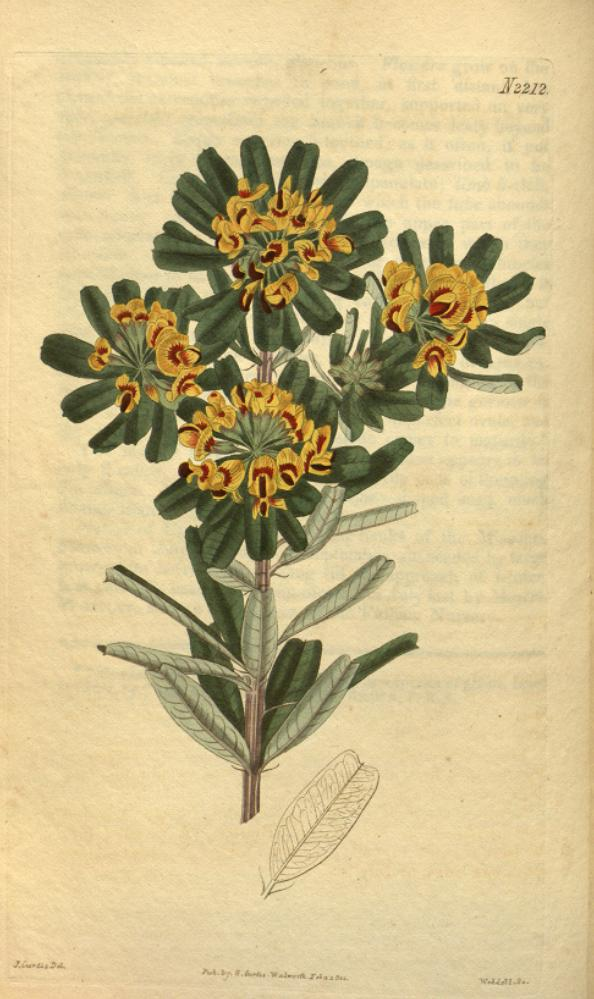
- An illustration from Curtis's Botanical Magazine (1818).

Scientific classification
- Kingdom: Plantae
- Clade: Tracheophytes
- Clade: Angiosperms
- Clade: Eudicots
- Clade: Rosids
- Order: Fabales
- Family: Fabaceae
- Subfamily: Faboideae
- Genus: Gastrolobium
- Species: G. bilobum

Binomial name
- Gastrolobium bilobum R.Br.

Synonyms
- Gastrolobium corymbosum Turcz.

= Gastrolobium bilobum =

Heart-leaved poison

Species of plant

Gastrolobium bilobum, commonly known as heart-leaved poison, is a bushy shrub which is endemic to south west Western Australia.

The species is a member of the family Fabaceae and is probably the most toxic species in the genus Gastrolobium, containing high levels of monofluoroacetic acid.

The species grows to a height of up to 4 metres. Between late winter and early summer (August to December in Australia) it produces yellow-orange pea-flowers with a central yellow area encircled by a band of red, and a maroon keel. The leaves are cuneiform, obovate or elliptic.

The species was first formally described by botanist Robert Brown and published in Hortus Kew in 1811.

In the nineteenth century as a plant within the group of gastrolobium, it was written about in the local press. This continued into the early and mid twentieth century, due to the affects on agriculture.

It has been further analyzed within the Australian Nucleotide and Protein sequencing.

The vernacular name has been common for over 140 years, and is inappropriate due to the leaves being wedge shaped, not heart shaped as the name suggests.

It occurs in the south-west of the state, usually on granite-based soils on peaks and outcrops as well as along rivers. It is associated with karri and marri forest as well as mallee and heathland.
