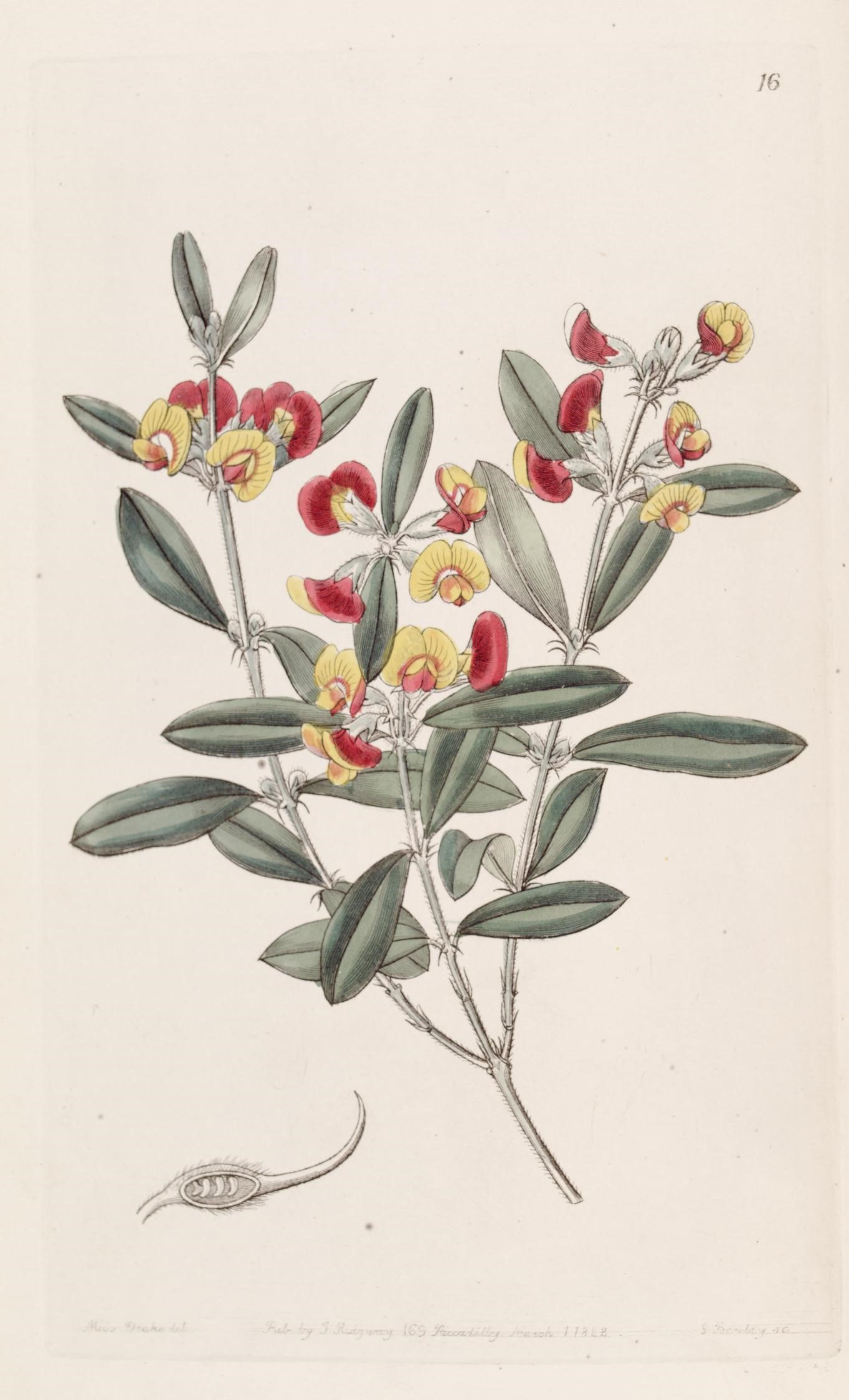

Scientific classification
- Kingdom: Plantae
- Clade: Embryophytes
- Clade: Tracheophytes
- Clade: Spermatophytes
- Clade: Angiosperms
- Clade: Eudicots
- Clade: Rosids
- Order: Fabales
- Family: Fabaceae
- Subfamily: Faboideae
- Genus: Gastrolobium
- Species: G. capitatum

Binomial name
- Gastrolobium capitatum (Benth.) G.Chandler & Crisp

= Gastrolobium capitatum =

Species of flowering plant

Gastrolobium capitatum, commonly known as bacon and eggs, is a species of flowering plant native to southern Western Australia. It is a shrub that grows up to one metre (3.3 ft) tall, growing on sandy to loamy soils, laterite or granite, on slopes, outcrops, swamps or plains.

It flowers from June to September and has orange-yellow flowers.
