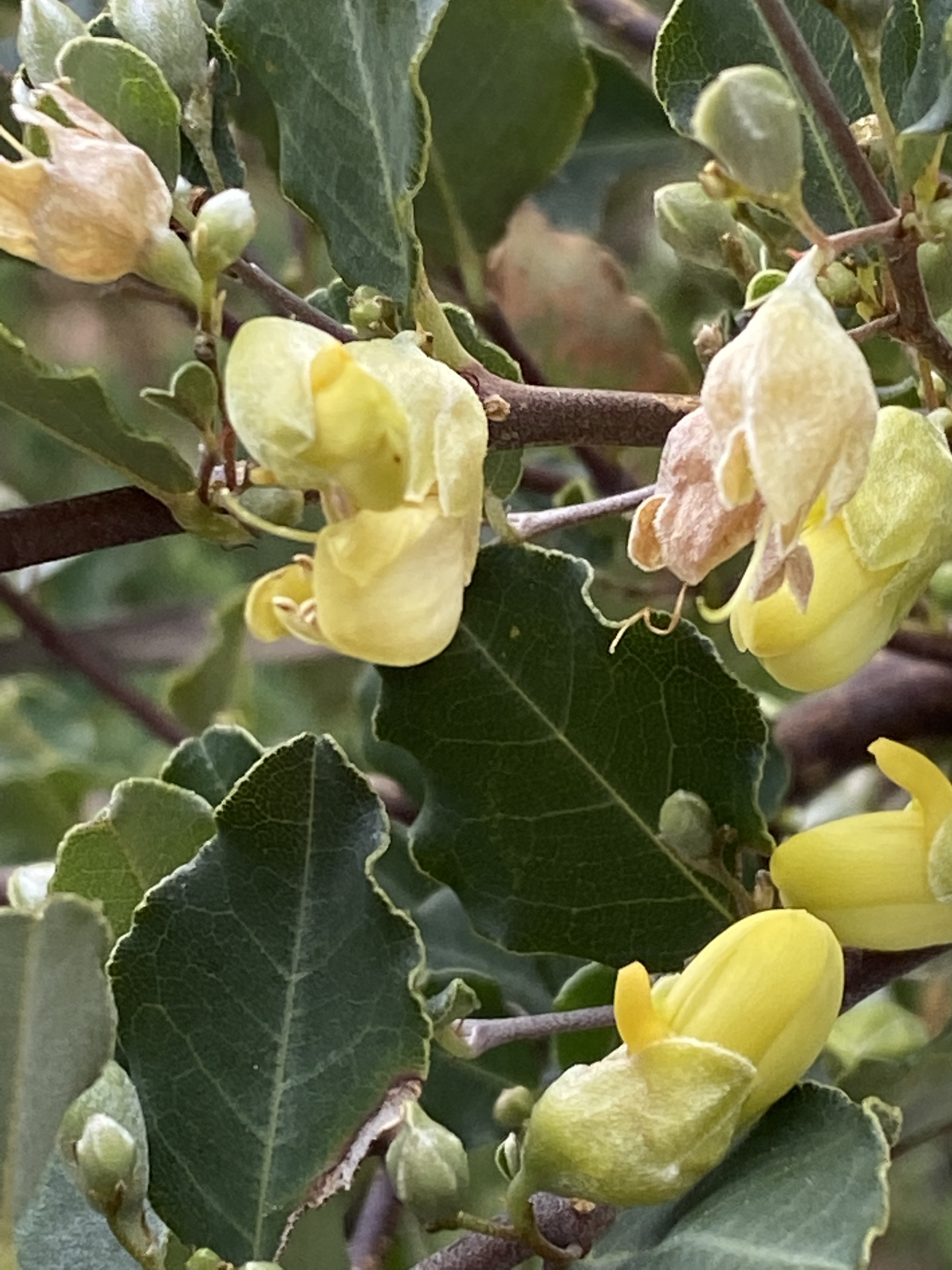

Scientific classification
- Kingdom: Plantae
- Clade: Tracheophytes
- Clade: Angiosperms
- Clade: Eudicots
- Clade: Rosids
- Order: Fabales
- Family: Fabaceae
- Subfamily: Faboideae
- Genus: Gastrolobium
- Species: G. sericeum

Binomial name
- Gastrolobium sericeum (Sm.) G.Chandler & Crisp

Synonyms
- Brachysema sericeum (Sm.) Domin; Brachysema undulatum Ker Gawl.; Chorizema sericeum Sm.

= Gastrolobium sericeum =

Species of legume

Gastrolobium sericeum is a flowering plant in the family Fabaceae. It is endemic to the south-west of Western Australia. It is a prostrate, low shrub with pendulous yellow, green, red or nearly black pea-flowers from spring to summer.

== Description ==
Gastrolobium sericeum is a low growing, dense prostrate or twining shrub to 1 m (3 ft 3 in) high. The branchlets more or less needle-shaped and smooth. The leaves are arranged alternately on the stem, elliptic to orb-shaped sometimes oval, 6–50 mm (0.24–1.97 in) long, 6–30 mm (0.24–1.18 in) wide, prominently veined, wavy, margins finely scalloped and rolled under, apex rounded to sharp or occasionally notched. The pendulous yellow, green, red or nearly black pea-flowers have yellowish or green markings, the standard petal 15 mm (0.59 in) long, the keel 12–16 mm (0.47–0.63 in) long and smooth. Flowering occurs from September to December and the fruit is a pod. It is not known whether this species shares the toxic properties of many other members of the genus Gastrolobium.

== Taxonomy ==
Gastrolobium sericeum was first formally described in 1864 by botanist James Edward Smith and the description published in Transactions of the Linnean Society of London . He gave it the name Chorizema sericeum Subsequently, it was placed in the genus Brachysema. Finally, in 1995, botanist Michael Crisp placed the species in the genus Gastrolobium along with a number of other Brachysema species.

== Distribution ==
This species is usually found along the edge of streams or swamps.
