= Gastrolobium brevipes =

Scientific classification
- Kingdom: Plantae
- Clade: Tracheophytes
- Clade: Angiosperms
- Clade: Eudicots
- Clade: Rosids
- Order: Fabales
- Family: Fabaceae
- Subfamily: Faboideae
- Genus: Gastrolobium
- Species: G. brevipes

Binomial name
- Gastrolobium brevipes Crisp

Species of legume

Gastrolobium brevipes, also known as Hill Wallflower Poison, is a shrub that is endemic to the Central Ranges region of Western Australia, Northern Territory and South Australia. It is a member of the family Fabaceae, grows to 2.5 metres high and produces orange red pea-flowers in July.

== Taxonomy ==
The species was first formally described in 1983 botanist Michael Crisp and the description was published in the Kew Bulletin as well as Australian Systematic Botany.

== Distribution and habitat ==
It is found in the IBRA region of the Central Ranges, mainly the George Gill and MacDonnell Ranges. The habitat is on dunefields. sandy gravelly soils or rock soils, or dry watercourses.
