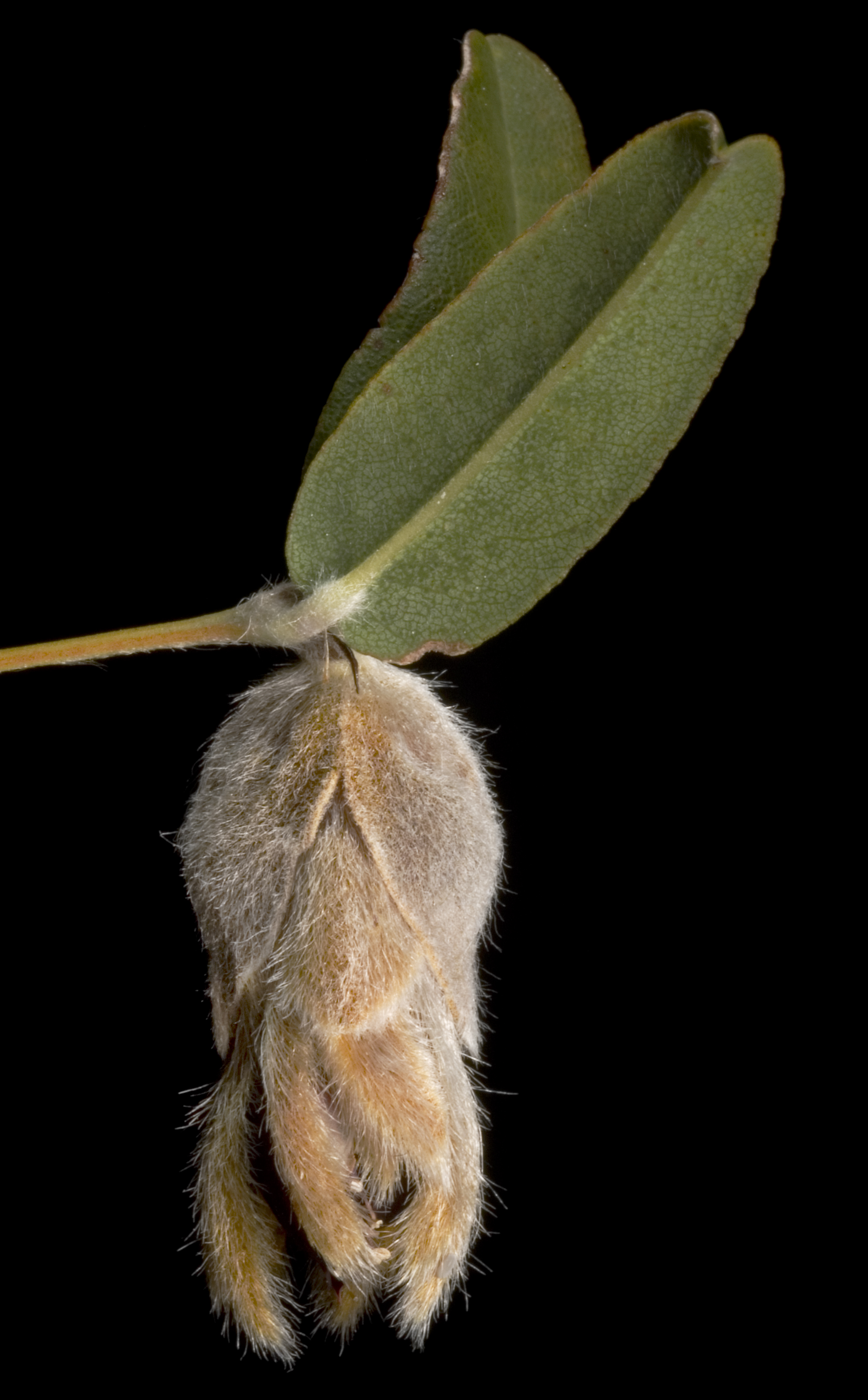

Conservation status
- Priority Three — Poorly Known Taxa (DEC)

Scientific classification
- Kingdom: Plantae
- Clade: Tracheophytes
- Clade: Angiosperms
- Clade: Eudicots
- Clade: Rosids
- Order: Fabales
- Family: Fabaceae
- Subfamily: Faboideae
- Genus: Gastrolobium
- Species: G. formosum

Binomial name
- Gastrolobium formosum (Kippist ex Lindl.) G.Chandler & Crisp

Synonyms
- Cryptosema pimeleoides Meisn. Jansonia formosa Kippist; Jansonia pimeleoides (Meisn.) C.A.Gardner

= Gastrolobium formosum =

Species of plant

Gastrolobium formosum is a small, trailing shrub, with red flowers, in the pea family (Fabaceae), which grows up to a metre high, on clays and loam in swamps and along river banks. The inflorescence consists of head of four unstalked flowers which is sheathed by a whorl of large bracts, with the flower petals being obscured by the lower calyx lobes. The standard petal is less than on third the keel petal. It is native to the south-west of Western Australia.

It was first described as Jansonia formosa by Richard Kippist in 1847, with a more detailed description by Kippist in 1851. It was transferred to the genus, Gastrolobium in 2002 by Chandler, Crisp, Cayzer, and Bayer.

The specific epithet, formosum, is a Latin adjective, formosus -a, -um, which describes the plant as "well-formed", "handsome", or "beautiful".
