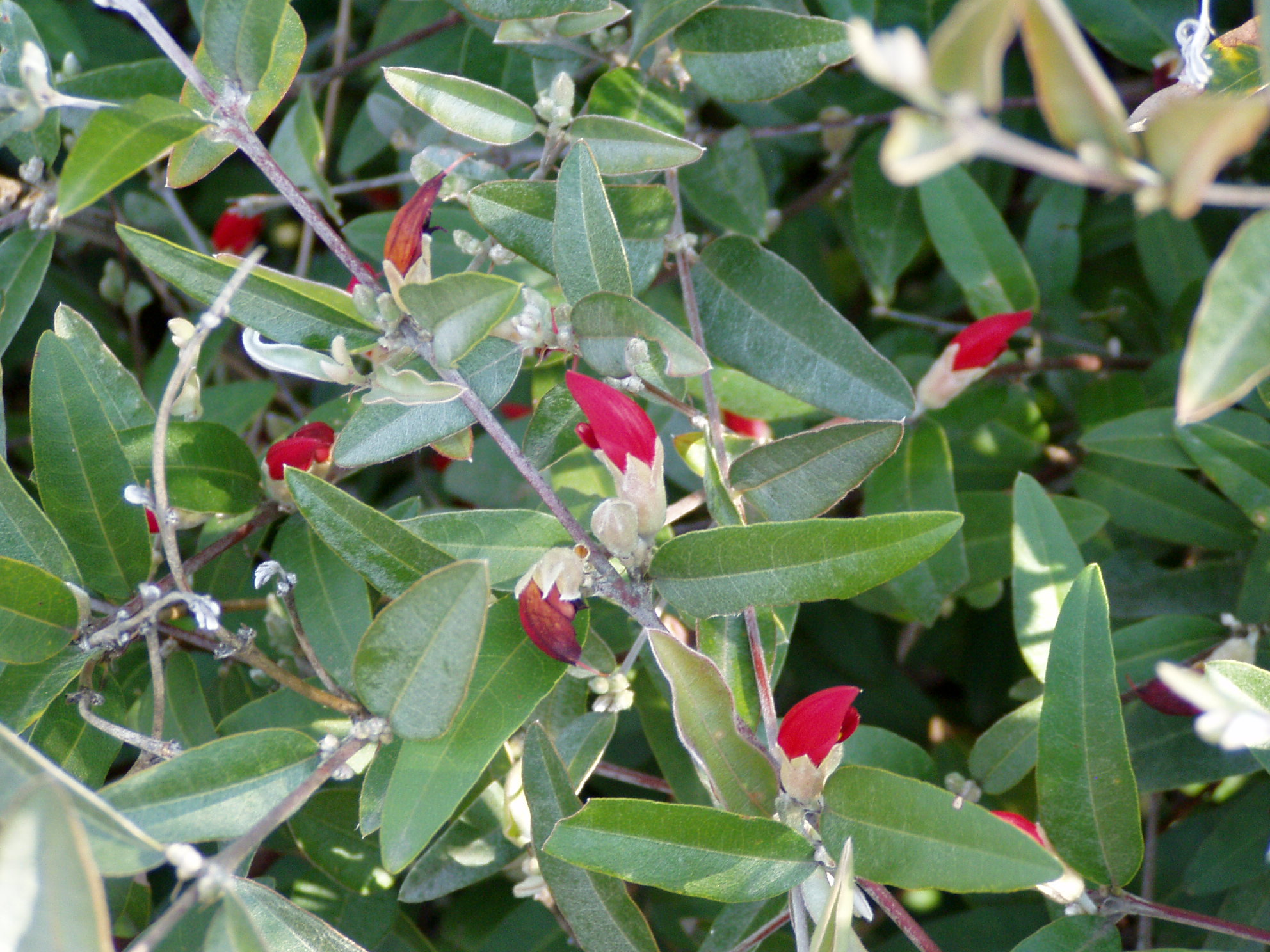

Scientific classification
- Kingdom: Plantae
- Clade: Tracheophytes
- Clade: Angiosperms
- Clade: Eudicots
- Clade: Rosids
- Order: Fabales
- Family: Fabaceae
- Subfamily: Faboideae
- Genus: Gastrolobium
- Species: G. celsianum

Binomial name
- Gastrolobium celsianum (Lemaire) G.Chandler & Crisp

Synonyms
- Brachysema acuminatum Jacques; Brachysema lanceolatum Meisn.; Brachysema lanceolatum var. hypargyreum Meisn.; Brachysema lanceolatum Meisn. var. lanceolatum; Brachysema lanceolatum var. planifolium Meisn.; Brachysema speciosum Lesc.

= Gastrolobium celsianum =

Swan River pea

Species of legume

Gastrolobium celsianum, the Swan River pea, is a low-growing shrub which is endemic to Western Australia.

It is a member of the pea family Fabaceae and of the genus Gastrolobium, which contains many toxic species; however the Swan River pea is not toxic and is recommended for garden use by the Australian National Botanic Gardens.

The species can grow to 1 m (3.3 ft) tall by 3 m (9.8 ft) broad. The red flowers, which have a distinctive long and curving keel, usually appear between August and November in Australia (late winter to late spring). The ovate leaves are glossy green above and silvery below.

The species was first formally described by the French botanist Charles Antoine Lemaire in 1844 and published in Horticulteur Francais as Brachysema lanceolatum. In 2002 botanists Gregory Chandler and Michael Crisp reassigned the species to the genus Gastrolobium along with other Brachysema species and gave it the current name. The variety Brachysema lanceolatum var. glabrescens Meisn. was made a species in its own right and named Gastrolobium bracteolosum (Crisp) G.Chandler & Crisp.

Gastrolobium celsianum occurs in the south-west of the state of Western Australia, usually on sandy or gravelly soils along watercourses and also within mallee and woodland where it is found on flats or in moist depressions.

The species has been popular in cultivation for many years. It is tolerant of a wide range of soils but requires good drainage. Although performing best in full sun, it will tolerate light shade.
