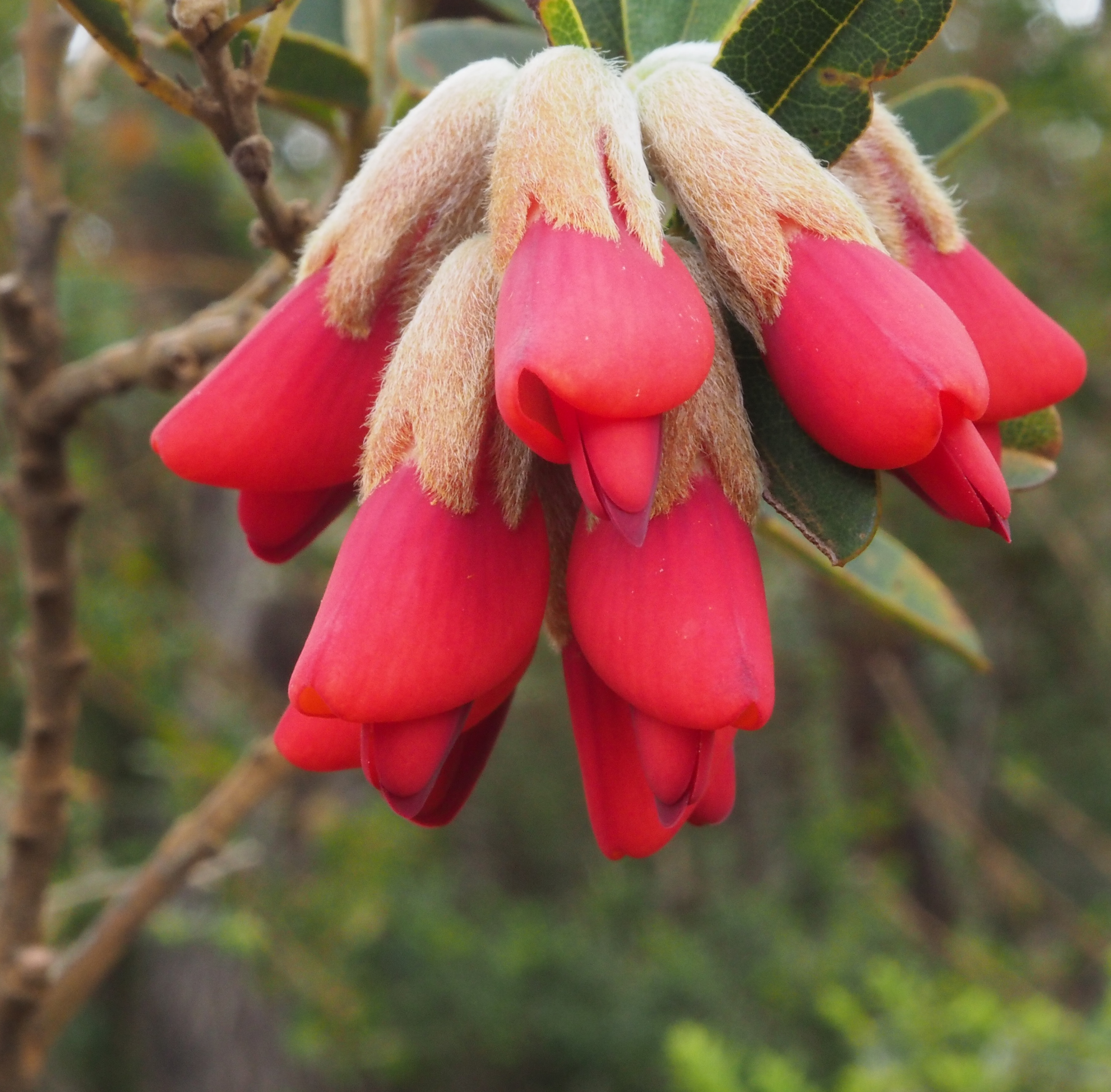

Scientific classification
- Kingdom: Plantae
- Clade: Tracheophytes
- Clade: Angiosperms
- Clade: Eudicots
- Clade: Rosids
- Order: Fabales
- Family: Fabaceae
- Subfamily: Faboideae
- Genus: Gastrolobium
- Species: G. rubrum

Binomial name
- Gastrolobium rubrum (Crisp) G.Chandler & Crisp

Synonyms
- Nemcia atropurpurea var. minorifolia Domin; Nemcia rubra Crisp

= Gastrolobium rubrum =

Species of legume

Gastrolobium rubrum is a shrub in the family Fabaceae. It is endemic to the south west of Western Australia.

The species grows up to 1.5 metres high and produces red flowers which appear between September and October (spring) in the species' native range.
