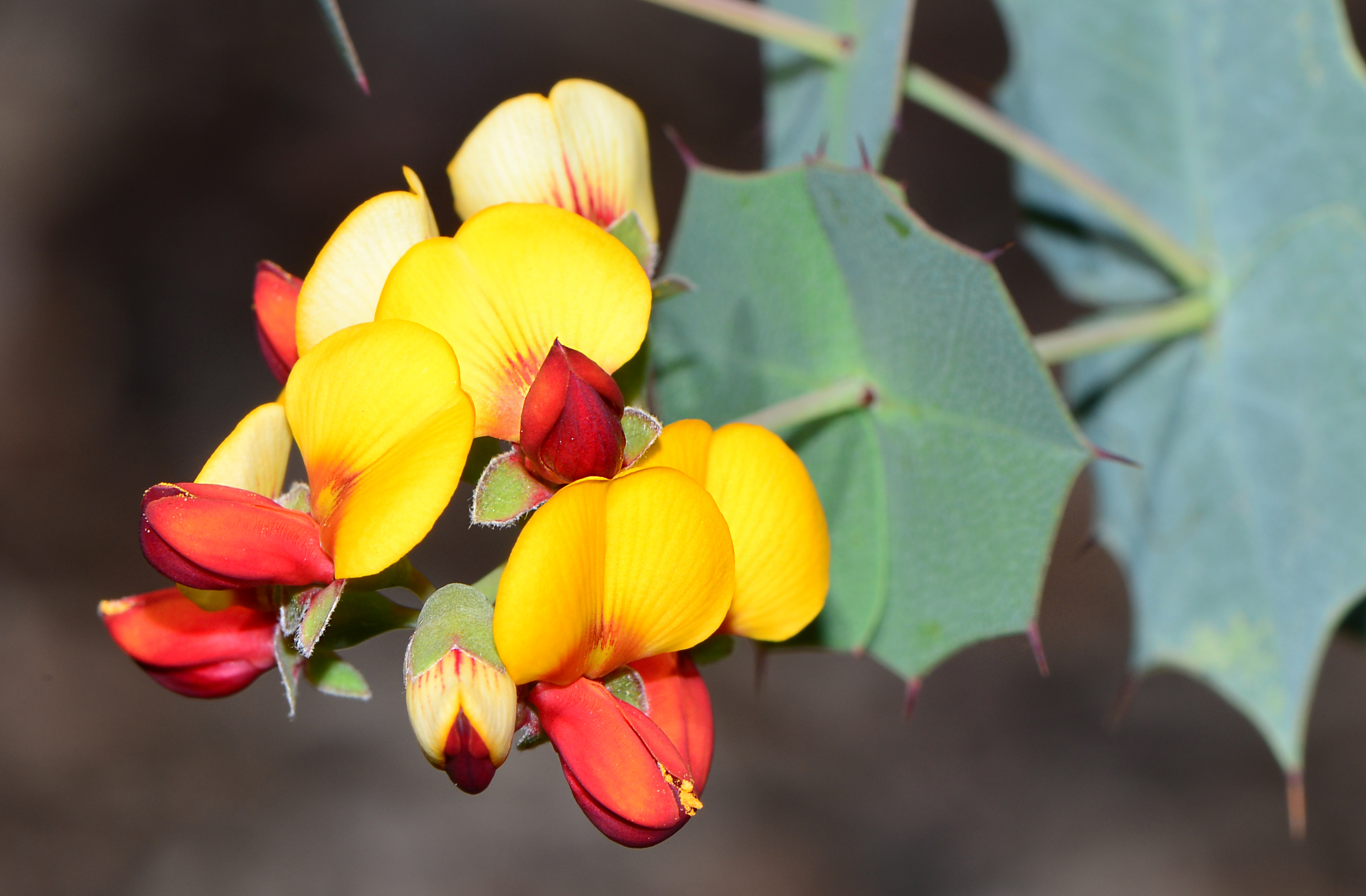

Scientific classification
- Kingdom: Plantae
- Clade: Tracheophytes
- Clade: Angiosperms
- Clade: Eudicots
- Clade: Rosids
- Order: Fabales
- Family: Fabaceae
- Subfamily: Faboideae
- Genus: Gastrolobium
- Species: G. spinosum

Binomial name
- Gastrolobium spinosum Benth.

Synonyms
- Gastrolobium preissii Meisn.

= Gastrolobium spinosum =

Prickly poison

Species of legume

Gastrolobium spinosum, also known as prickly poison, is a shrub in the family Fabaceae. It is endemic to Southwest Australia

The species ranges from 0.3 to 3.5 metres in height. It has leaves with spiky, dentate margins and a long, tapering, pointed apex. The pea flowers are yellow to orange with a band of red surrounding the yellow centre, and a pink and maroon keel. These are produced from early spring to early summer (September to December in Australia).

The species was first formally described by English botanist George Bentham, this description being published by John Lindley in A Sketch of the Vegetation of the Swan River Colony in 1839.
