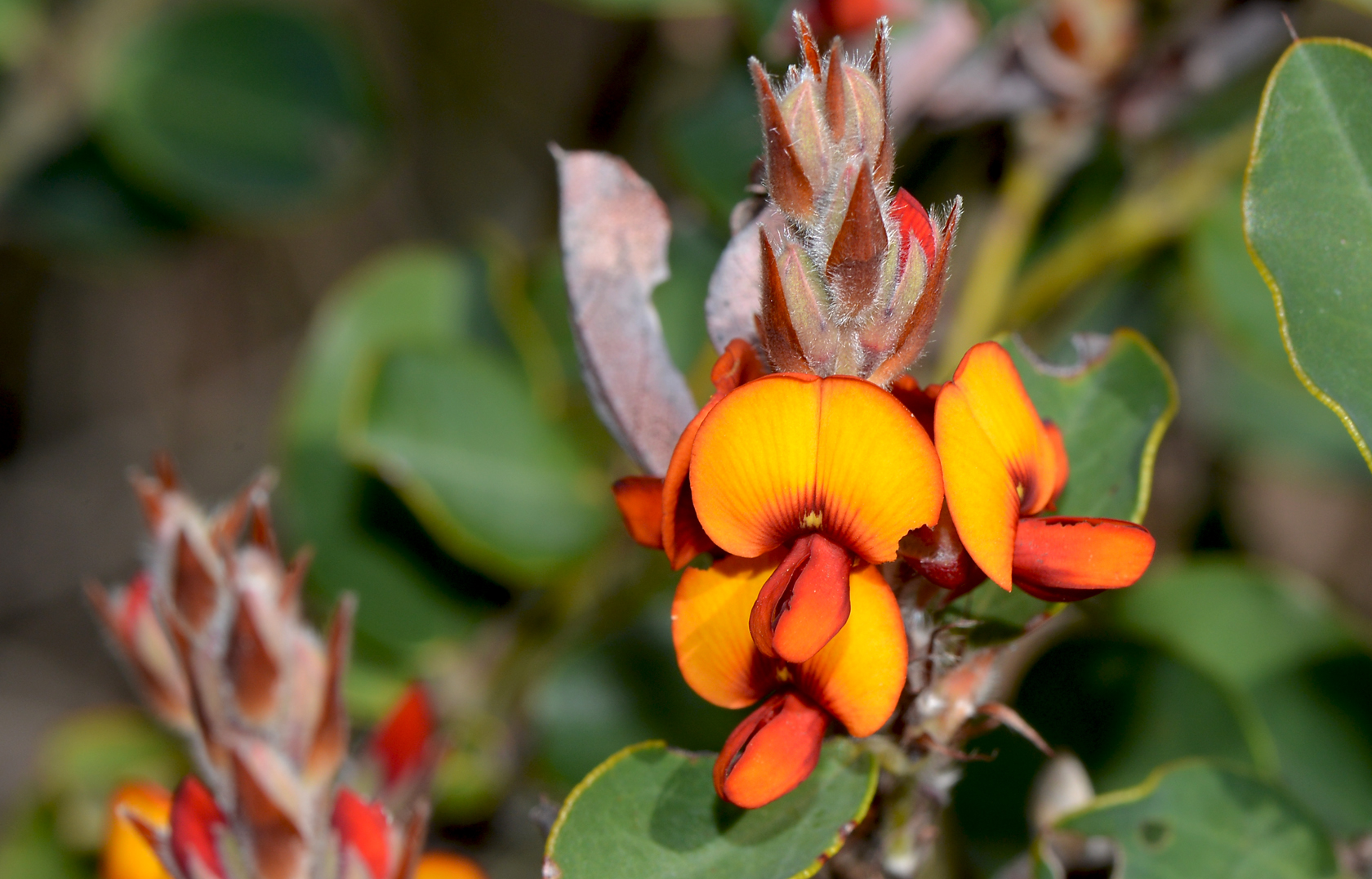

Scientific classification
- Kingdom: Plantae
- Clade: Tracheophytes
- Clade: Angiosperms
- Clade: Eudicots
- Clade: Rosids
- Order: Fabales
- Family: Fabaceae
- Subfamily: Faboideae
- Genus: Gastrolobium
- Species: G. glabratum

Binomial name
- Gastrolobium glabratum G.Chandler & Crisp

= Gastrolobium glabratum =

Species of legume endemic to Western Australia

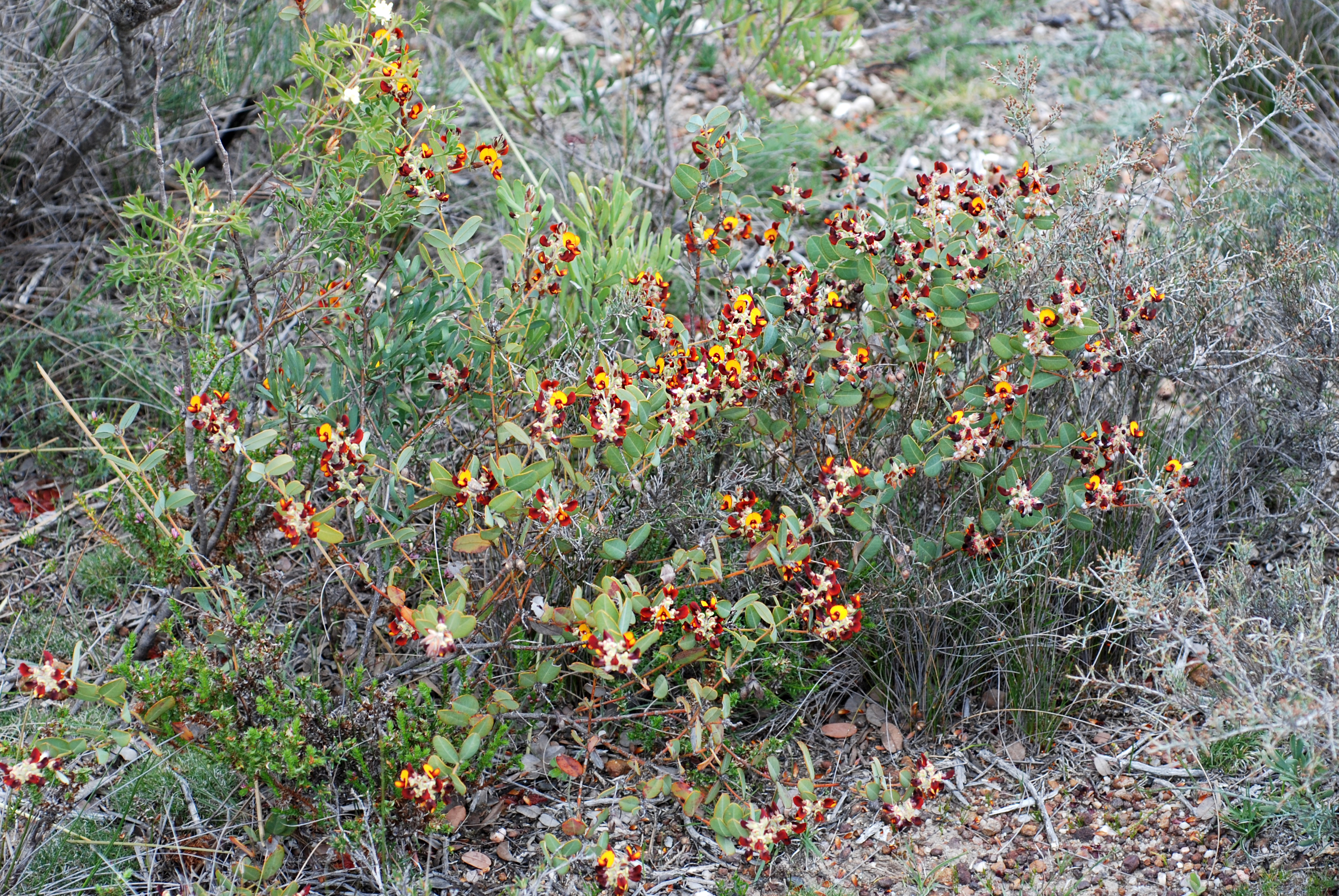
Habit

Gastrolobium glabratum is a species of flowering plant in the family Fabaceae and is endemic to Western Australia. It is an erect or low-lying shrub with egg-shaped leaves and yellow and red pea flowers, sometimes with orange markings.

== Description ==
Gastrolobium glabratum is a weak, erect or low-lying, often clumped shrub that typically grows to a height of 80 cm (31 in). Its leaves are egg-shaped, 5–46 mm (0.20–1.81 in) long and 10–27 mm (0.39–1.06 in) wide with stipules 5.5–7.5 mm (0.22–0.30 in) long at the base of the petioles. The flowers are borne on pedicels 0.5–2.5 mm (0.020–0.098 in) long, with sepals 5.2–7.5 mm (0.20–0.30 in) long. The petals are yellow and red, sometimes with orange markings, the standard petal 7.5–9 mm (0.30–0.35 in) long, the wings 5.2–8.7 mm (0.20–0.34 in) long and the keel 5.5–9 mm (0.22–0.35 in) long. Flowering occurs from August to October.

== Taxonomy ==
Gastrolobium glabratum was first formally described in 2002 by Gregory T. Chandler and Michael Douglas Crisp from a specimen collected near Qualen Road west of York in 1998. The specific epithet (glabratum) means "nearly glabrous".

== Distribution and habitat ==
This species of gastrolobium grows in heavy clay and loam on undulating plains in the Jarrah Forest bioregion of south-western Western Australia.

== Conservation status ==
Gastrolobium glabratum is listed as "not threatened" under the Western Australian Government Biodiversity Conservation Act 2016.
