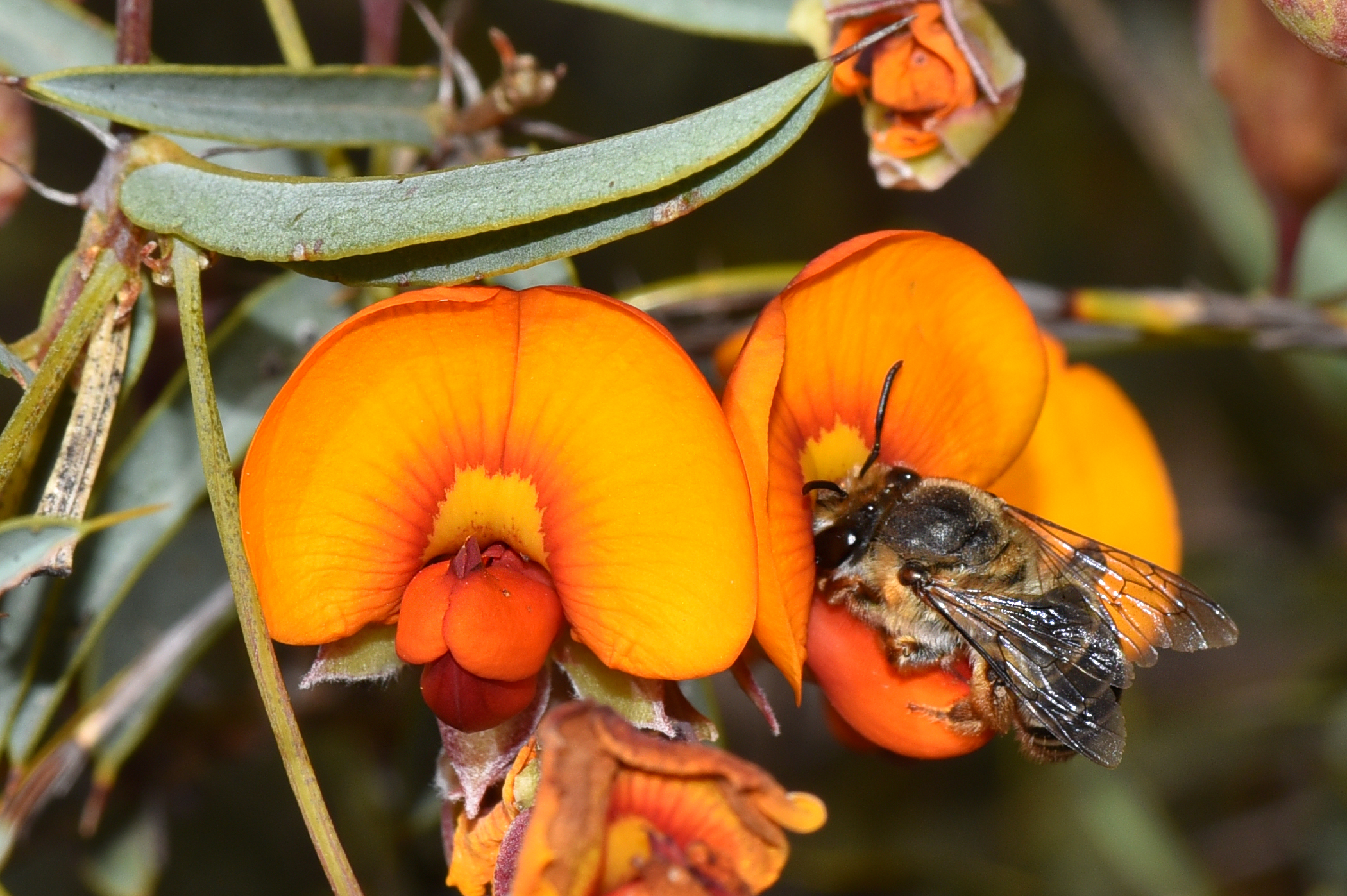

Scientific classification
- Kingdom: Plantae
- Clade: Tracheophytes
- Clade: Angiosperms
- Clade: Eudicots
- Clade: Rosids
- Order: Fabales
- Family: Fabaceae
- Subfamily: Faboideae
- Genus: Gastrolobium
- Species: G. calycinum

Binomial name
- Gastrolobium calycinum Benth.

= Gastrolobium calycinum =

York Road poison

Species of legume endemic to Western Australia

Gastrolobium calycinum commonly known as York Road poison, is a flowering plant in the family Fabaceae. It has variable leaves and yellow pea flowers with a pink or red centre and is endemic to Western Australia.

== Description ==
Gastrolobium calycinum is an upright, bushy shrub to 1.5 m (4 ft 11 in) high, leaves broadly oval to orb-shaped, tapering to a sharp point, up to 2.54–5.08 cm (1.00–2.00 in) long, stiff, veined, sometimes with a whitish covering and arranged opposite or in a grouping of three. The yellow pea flowers are in short racemes, bracts brown and stiff, concave and rounded. The standard petal is not as long as the calyx, wings as long as the keel. Flowering occurs from August to November.

== Naming ==
The specific epithet (calycinum) is in reference to a notable calyx.

== Distribution and habitat ==
York Road poison grows in a variety of situations including clay, loam or sandy soils on hills or flats in Western Australia.
