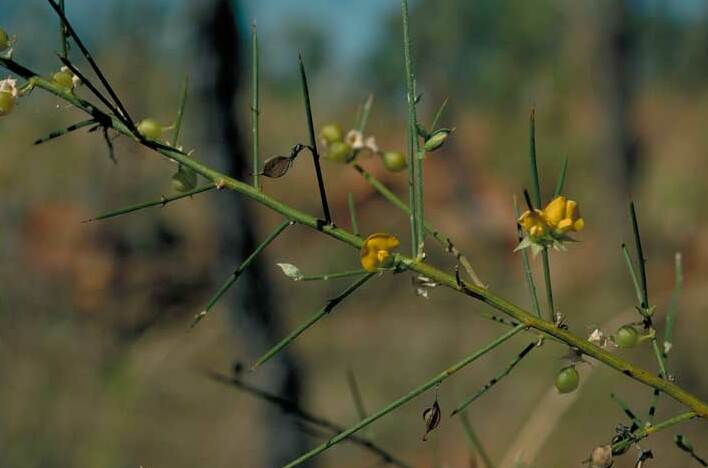
- In the Kimberley region

Scientific classification
- Kingdom: Plantae
- Clade: Tracheophytes
- Clade: Angiosperms
- Clade: Eudicots
- Clade: Rosids
- Order: Fabales
- Family: Fabaceae
- Subfamily: Faboideae
- Genus: Mirbelia
- Species: M. viminalis

Binomial name
- Mirbelia viminalis (A.Cunn. ex Benth.) C.A.Gardner

= Mirbelia viminalis =

Species of legume

Mirbelia viminalis is a species of flowering plant in the family Fabaceae and is endemic to northern Australia. It is an erect to spreading, spiny, leafless shrub with yellow flowers.

== Description ==
Mirbelia viminalis is an erect to spreading shrub that typically grows to a height of 0.4–2 m (1 ft 4 in – 6 ft 7 in) and has many spine-tipped branches, its leaves reduced to scales. The flowers are similar to those of M. ramulosa except that the bracteoles are close to the base of the sepals. The outer surface of the sepals has hairs pressed against it, and the petals are entirely yellow. Flowering occurs in most months, and the fruit is a pod 7–8 mm (0.28–0.31 in) long.

== Taxonomy ==
This species of Mirbelia was first formally described in 1837 by George Bentham in Commentationes de Leguminosarum Generibus, based on an unpublished description by Allan Cunningham, who gave it the name Jacksonia viminalis. In 1930, Charles Gardner changed the name to Mirbelia viminalis in Enumeratio Plantarum Australiae Occidentalis. The specific epithet (viminalis) means "having long, thin branches."

== Distribution and habitat ==
Mirbelia viminalis grows on rocky outcrops, scree slopes and hills and is widespread in the north of Western Australia, the Northern Territory and northern Queensland.

== Conservation status ==
Mirbelia viminalis is listed as "not threatened" by the Government of Western Australia Department of Biodiversity, Conservation and Attractions, and as of "least concern" in the Northern Territory and Queensland.
