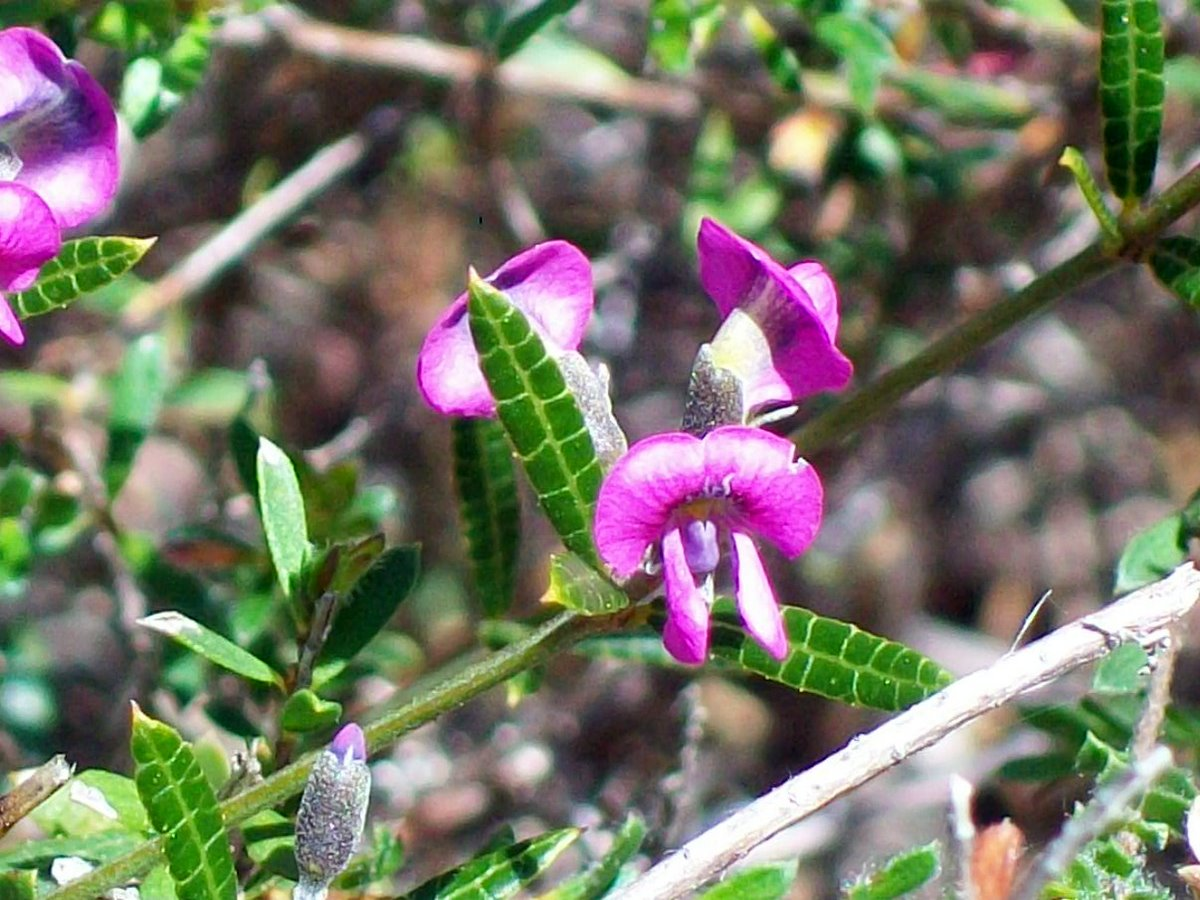
- Mirbelia rubiifolia

Scientific classification
- Kingdom: Plantae
- Clade: Tracheophytes
- Clade: Angiosperms
- Clade: Eudicots
- Clade: Rosids
- Order: Fabales
- Family: Fabaceae
- Subfamily: Faboideae
- Clade: Mirbelioids
- Genus: Mirbelia; Sm.

Species
- See text.

Synonyms
- Dichosema Benth.; Oxycladium F.Muell.

= Mirbelia =

Genus of legumes

Mirbelia is a plant genus belonging to the family Fabaceae and is endemic to Australia, occurring in every mainland state except South Australia. Plants in the genus Mirbelia are prickly, perennial shrubs with simple, sometimes sharply-pointed leaves, or the leaves absent. The flowers are arranged singly or in groups in leaf axils or on the ends of branches, the sepals joined at the base with five teeth. The petals are usually red, orange, purplish or bluish and the fruit is an inflated pod.

== Description ==
Plants in the genus Mirbelia are prickly shrubs with spiny branchlets or sharply-pointed leaves. The leaves are simple with the edges turned down or rolled under, sometimes absent, or sometimes with small stipules at the base. The flowers are arranged in leaf axils or on the ends of branches, either singly or in clusters or racemes sometimes with small bracts, sometimes with small bracteoles. The sepals are joined at the base with five overlapping teeth, the two upper teeth usually wider than the lower three and fused for most of their length. The petals are usually yellow, orange, purplish or bluish, the standard petal more or less round to kidney-shaped and longer than the wings and keel. The fruit is an inflated pod containing two or more black, shiny seeds.

== Taxonomy ==
The genus Mirbelia was first formally described in 1895 by James Edward Smith in his book, the Annals of Botany and the first species described was Mirbelia reticulata, now known as Mirbelia rubiifolia. The genus name honours Charles-François Brisseau de Mirbel.

=== Species list ===
The following is a list of species of Mirbelia accepted by the Australian Plant Census as at June 2022:

- Mirbelia aotoides F.Muell. (Qld.)
- Mirbelia balsiformis R.Butcher (W.A.)
- Mirbelia baueri (Benth.) J.Thomps. (Qld.)
- Mirbelia confertiflora Pedley (Qld., N.S.W.)
- Mirbelia corallina R.Butcher (W.A.)
- Mirbelia densiflora C.A.Gardner (W.A.)
- Mirbelia depressa E.Pritz. (W.A.)
- Mirbelia dilatata R.Br. — holly-leaved mirbelia
- Mirbelia ferricola R.Butcher (W.A.)
- Mirbelia floribunda Benth. ex Lindl. — purple mirbelia (W.A.)
- Mirbelia granitica Crisp & J.M.Taylor (W.A.)
- Mirbelia longifolia C.A.Gardner (W.A.)
- Mirbelia microphylla (Turcz.) Benth. (W.A.)
- Mirbelia multicaulis (Turcz.) Benth. (W.A.)
- Mirbelia ovata Meisn. (W.A.)
- Mirbelia oxylobioides F.Muell. — mountain mirbelia (N.S.W., A.C.T., Vic., Tas.)
- Mirbelia platylobioides (DC.) Joy Thomps. (N.S.W.)
- Mirbelia pungens A.Cunn. ex G.Don — prickly mirbelia (Qld., N.S.W., A.C.T., Vic.)
- Mirbelia ramulosa (Benth. ex Lindl.) C.A.Gardner (W.A., N.T.)
- Mirbelia rhagodioides Crisp & J.M.Taylor (W.A.)
- Mirbelia rubiifolia (Andrews) G.Don — heathy mirbelia (Qld., N.S.W., Vic.)
- Mirbelia seorsifolia (F.Muell.) C.A.Gardner (W.A.)
- Mirbelia speciosa Sieber ex DC.
  - Mirbelia speciosa subsp. ringrosei (F.M.Bailey) Pedley (Qld., N.S.W.)
  - Mirbelia speciosa subsp. speciosa DC.
- Mirbelia spinosa (Benth.) Benth. (W.A.)
- Mirbelia stipitata Crisp & J.M.Taylor (W.A.)
- Mirbelia subcordata Turcz. (W.A.)
- Mirbelia taxifolia C.A.Gardner (W.A.)
- Mirbelia trichocalyx Domin (W.A.)
- Mirbelia viminalis (A.Cunn. ex Benth.) C.A.Gardner (W.A., N.T., Qld.)
