= Mirbelia taxifolia =

Conservation status
- Priority One — Poorly Known Taxa (DEC)

Scientific classification
- Kingdom: Plantae
- Clade: Tracheophytes
- Clade: Angiosperms
- Clade: Eudicots
- Clade: Rosids
- Order: Fabales
- Family: Fabaceae
- Subfamily: Faboideae
- Genus: Mirbelia
- Species: M. taxifolia

Binomial name
- Mirbelia taxifolia C.A.Gardner

Species of plant

Mirbelia taxifolia is a species of flowering plant in the family Fabaceae and is endemic to inland Western Australia. It is a shrub that typically grows to a height of 60–90 cm (24–35 in) and has orange-yellow flowers in September. It grows in sandy soil in the Coolgardie bioregion of inland Western Australia.

The species was first formally described in 1943 by Charles Gardner in the Journal of the Royal Society of Western Australia from specimens he collected near Coolgardie. The specific epithet (taxifolia) means "yew tree-leaved".

Mirbelia taxifolia is listed as "Priority One" by the Government of Western Australia Department of Biodiversity, Conservation and Attractions, meaning that it is known from only one or a few locations where it is potentially at risk.
