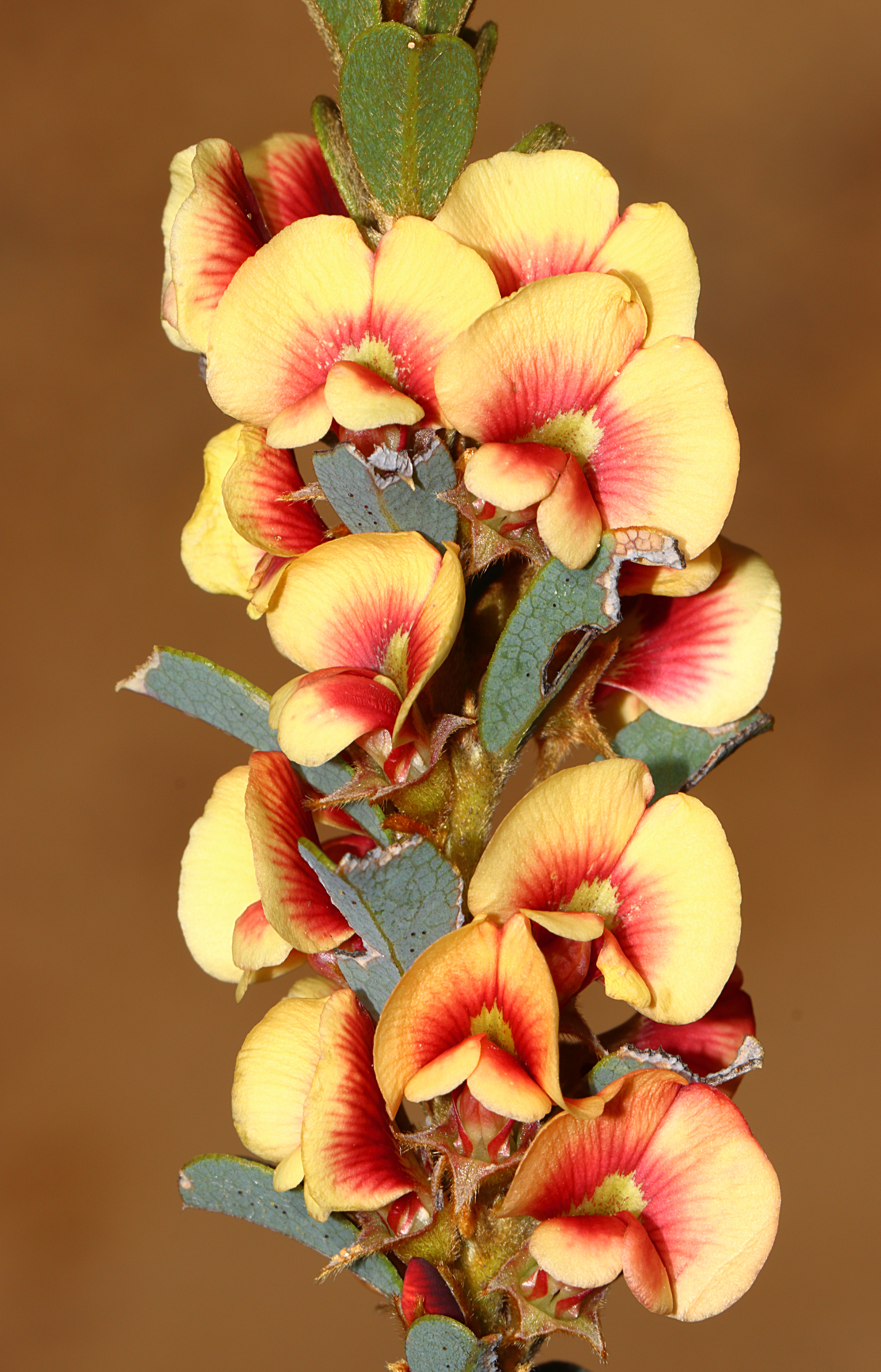

Scientific classification
- Kingdom: Plantae
- Clade: Tracheophytes
- Clade: Angiosperms
- Clade: Eudicots
- Clade: Rosids
- Order: Fabales
- Family: Fabaceae
- Subfamily: Faboideae
- Genus: Mirbelia
- Species: M. seorsifolia

Binomial name
- Mirbelia seorsifolia (F.Muell.) C.A.Gardner

Synonyms
- Mirbelia seorsifolium F.Muell.

= Mirbelia seorsifolia =

Species of plant

Mirbelia seorsifolia is a species of flowering plant in the family Fabaceae and is endemic to the south-west of Western Australia. It is an erect, open shrub that typically grows to a height of 15–70 cm (5.9–27.6 in) and has yellow and red flowers from August to December. It grows on sandplains in the Avon Wheatbelt, Coolgardie, Great Victoria Desert, Murchison and Yalgoo bioregions of south-western Western Australia. The species was first formally described in 1876 by Ferdinand von Mueller, who gave it the name Gastrolobium seorsifolium in Fragmenta Phytographiae Australiae. In 1943, Charles Gardner changed the name to Mirbelia seorsifolia in Enumeratio Plantarum Australiae Occidentalis. The specific epithet (seorsifolia) means "separate leaves", referring to the well-spaced leaves. Mirbelia seorsifolia is listed as "not threatened" by the Government of Western Australia Department of Biodiversity, Conservation and Attractions.
