= Mirbelia densiflora =

Conservation status
- Priority Three — Poorly Known Taxa (DEC)

Scientific classification
- Kingdom: Plantae
- Clade: Tracheophytes
- Clade: Angiosperms
- Clade: Eudicots
- Clade: Rosids
- Order: Fabales
- Family: Fabaceae
- Subfamily: Faboideae
- Genus: Mirbelia
- Species: M. densiflora

Binomial name
- Mirbelia densiflora C.A.Gardner

Species of legume

Mirbelia densiflora is a species of flowering plant in the family Fabaceae and is endemic to the south-west of Western Australia. It is an erect or straggling shrub that typically grows to a height of 0.2–1 m (7.9 in – 3 ft 3.4 in) and has yellow or orange flowers from October to January. It was first formally described in 1942 by Charles Gardner in the Journal of the Royal Society of Western Australia. The specific epithet (densiflora) means "crowded-flowers". This mirbelia grows on ridges and plains in the Coolgardie and Mallee bioregions of south-western Western Australia, and is listed as "Priority Three" by the Government of Western Australia Department of Biodiversity, Conservation and Attractions, meaning that it is poorly known and known from only a few locations but is not under imminent threat.
