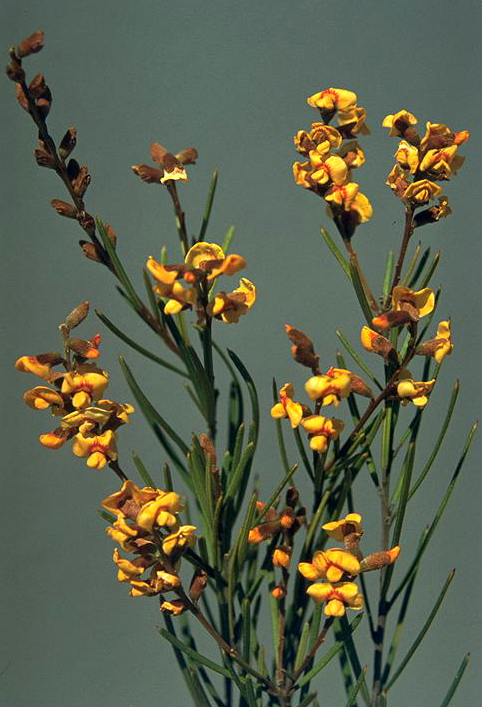
- Near Morawa

Scientific classification
- Kingdom: Plantae
- Clade: Tracheophytes
- Clade: Angiosperms
- Clade: Eudicots
- Clade: Rosids
- Order: Fabales
- Family: Fabaceae
- Subfamily: Faboideae
- Genus: Mirbelia
- Species: M. longifolia

Binomial name
- Mirbelia longifolia C.A.Gardner

= Mirbelia longifolia =

Species of legume

Mirbelia longifolia is a species of flowering plant in the family Fabaceae and is endemic to the south-west of Western Australia. It is an erect shrub that typically grows to a height of 0.6–2.4 m (2 ft 0 in – 7 ft 10 in) and has yellow or orange and purple flowers from September to October. It was first formally described in 1942 by Charles Gardner in the Journal of the Royal Society of Western Australia. The specific epithet (longifolia) means "long-leaved". This mirbelia grows on stony soil in the Avon Wheatbelt, Geraldton Sandplains and Yalgoo bioregions of south-western Western Australia, and is listed as "not threatened" by the Government of Western Australia Department of Biodiversity, Conservation and Attractions.
