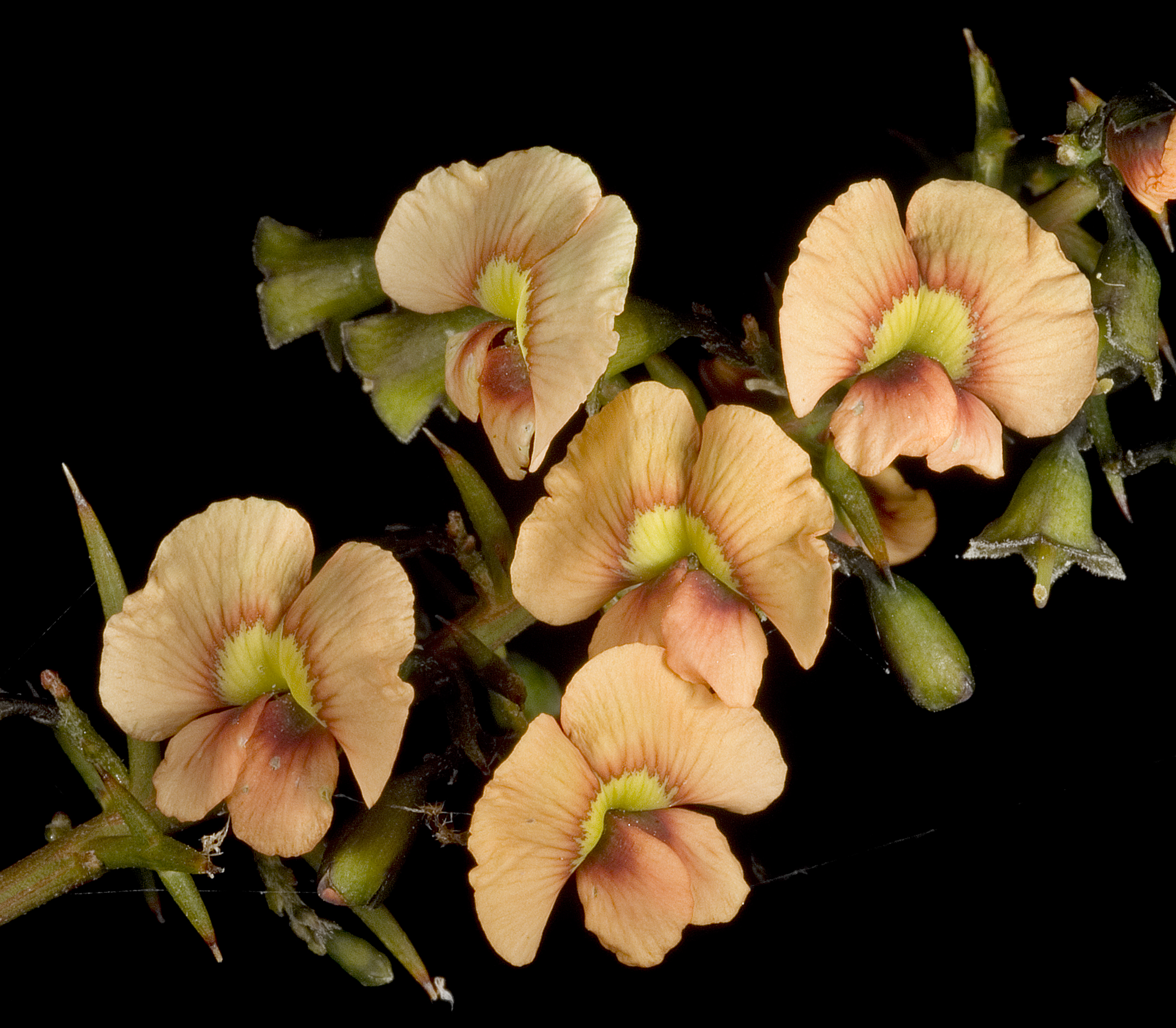

Scientific classification
- Kingdom: Plantae
- Clade: Tracheophytes
- Clade: Angiosperms
- Clade: Eudicots
- Clade: Rosids
- Order: Fabales
- Family: Fabaceae
- Subfamily: Faboideae
- Genus: Mirbelia
- Species: M. ramulosa

Binomial name
- Mirbelia ramulosa (Benth. ex Lindl.) C.A.Gardner

Synonyms
- List: Chorizema daviesioides Meisn.; Chorizema daviesioides Meisn. var. daviesioides; Chorizema daviesioides var. drummondianum Meisn.; Chorozema daviesioides Meisn. orth. var.; Chorozema daviesioides var. drummondianum Meisn. orth. var.; Daviesia ramulosa Benth. ex Lindl.; Mirbelia daviesioides (Meisn.) Benth.; Mirbelia daviesioides (Meisn.) Benth. var. daviesioides

= Mirbelia ramulosa =

Species of plant

Mirbelia ramulosa is a species of flowering plant in the family Fabaceae and is endemic to the south-west of Western Australia. It is an erect, much-branched, spiny, leafless shrub with yellow and red, purple or brown flowers.

== Description ==
Mirbelia ramulosa is an erect, spiny, leafless shrub with many branches, and that typically grows to a height of 0.3–2 m (1 ft 0 in – 6 ft 7 in). Its flowers are arranged in racemes near the ends of branches and are yellow and red, purple or brown, the sepals about 4 mm (0.16 in) long and joined at the base, the lobes much shorter than the tube, the two upper lobes joined for most of their length. The standard petal is twice as long as the sepals, the wings shorter than the standard and the keel shorter than the wings. Flowering occurs from June to November and the fruit is a pod 6–11 mm (0.24–0.43 in) long.

== Taxonomy ==
This species was first formally described in 1839 by John Lindley, who gave it the name Daviesia ramulosa in A Sketch of the Vegetation of the Swan River Colony. In 1930, Charles Gardner changed the name to Mirbelia ramulosa in Enumeratio Plantarum Australiae Occidentalis. The specific epithet (ramulosa) means "bearing branchlets".

== Distribution and habitat ==
Mirbelia ramulosa grows on rocky or gravelly hills and ranges and is widely distributed in the south -west of Western Australia and in isolated populations in the south of the Northern Territory.

== Conservation status ==
This species of pea is listed as "not threatened" by the Government of Western Australia Department of Biodiversity, Conservation and Attractions, but as "near threatened" under the Northern Territory Territory Parks and Wildlife Conservation Act.
