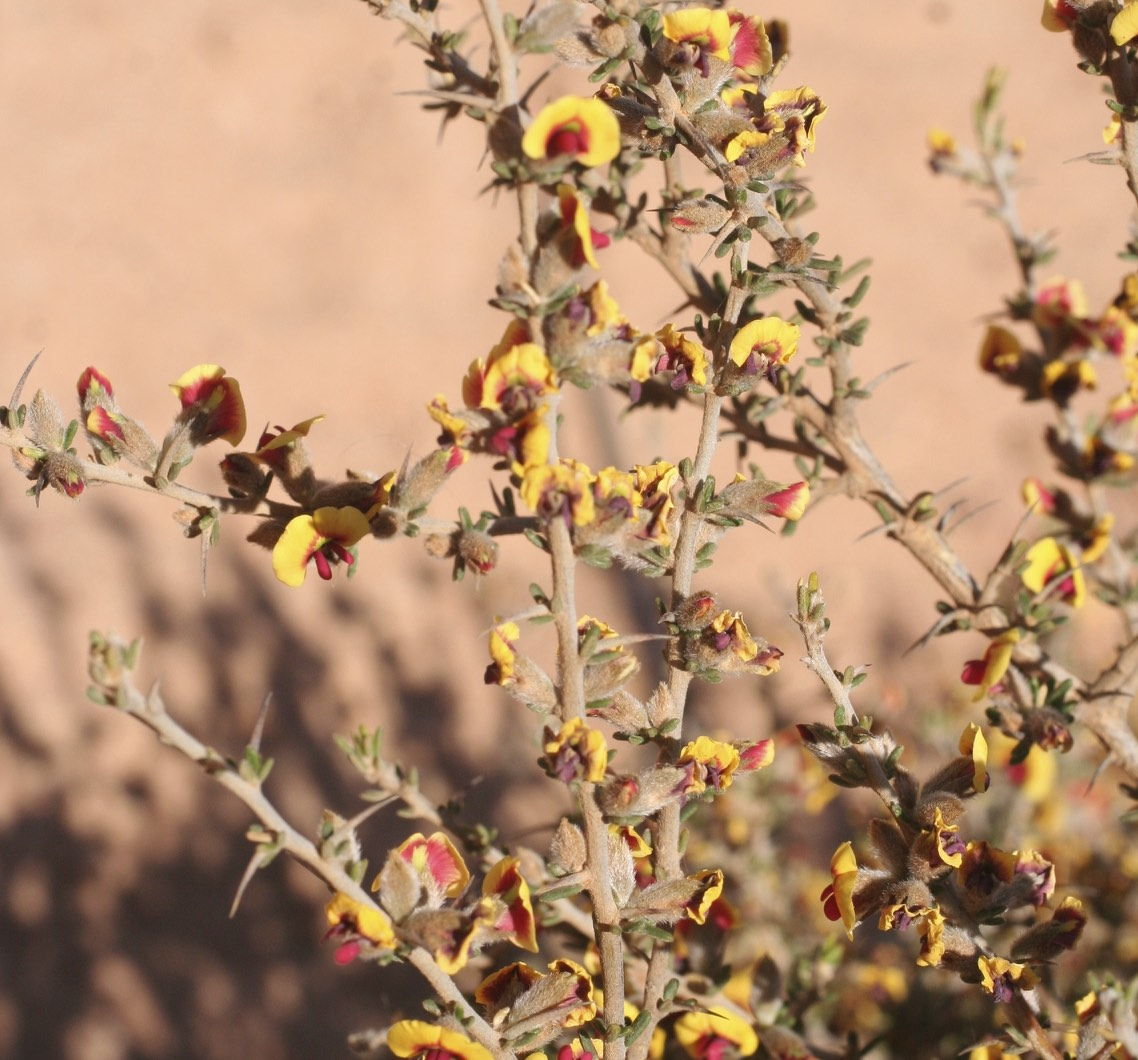
- Near Manmanning

Scientific classification
- Kingdom: Plantae
- Clade: Tracheophytes
- Clade: Angiosperms
- Clade: Eudicots
- Clade: Rosids
- Order: Fabales
- Family: Fabaceae
- Subfamily: Faboideae
- Genus: Mirbelia
- Species: M. trichocalyx

Binomial name
- Mirbelia trichocalyx Domin

= Mirbelia trichocalyx =

Species of plant

Mirbelia trichocalyx is a species of flowering plant in the family Fabaceae and is endemic to the south-west of Western Australia. It is a dense, erect, spiny shrub that typically grows to a height of 15–75 cm (5.9–29.5 in) and has orange or yellow and red flowers from July to October. It grows on plains, hills and breakaways in the Avon Wheatbelt, Coolgardie, Esperance Plains, Geraldton Sandplains, Jarrah Forest, Mallee and Swan Coastal Plain bioregions.

The species was first formally described in 1923 by Karel Domin in the Vestnik Kralovske Ceske Spolecnosti Nauk, Trida Matematiko-Prirodevedecke from specimens he collected by Arthur Dorrien-Smith. The specific epithet (trichocalyx) means "hair-like calyx".

Mirbelia taxifolia is listed as "not threatened" by the Government of Western Australia Department of Biodiversity, Conservation and Attractions.
