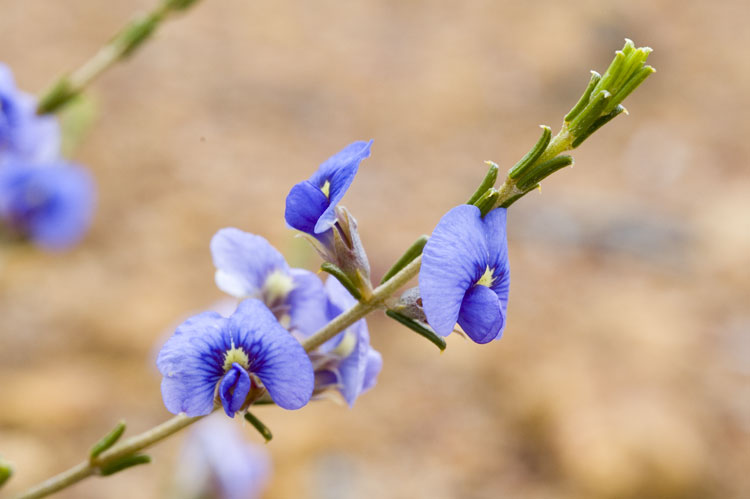
- Near Lake King

Scientific classification
- Kingdom: Plantae
- Clade: Tracheophytes
- Clade: Angiosperms
- Clade: Eudicots
- Clade: Rosids
- Order: Fabales
- Family: Fabaceae
- Subfamily: Faboideae
- Genus: Mirbelia
- Species: M. floribunda

Binomial name
- Mirbelia floribunda Benth. ex Lindl.

= Mirbelia floribunda =

Species of plant

Mirbelia floribunda, commonly known as purple mirbelia, is a species of flowering plant in the family Fabaceae and is endemic to the south-west of Western Australia. It is an erect, slender or straggling, much-branched shrub with narrowly linear leaves and bluish-purple flowers.

== Description ==
Mirbelia floribunda is an erect, slender or straggling shrub with many branches, and that typically grows to a height of 10–60 cm (3.9–23.6 in). Its leaves are scattered, sometimes arranged in opposite pairs or threes, narrowly linear, 3–7 mm (0.12–0.28 in) long, with a hooked tip. The flowers are arranged singly in many leaf axils and are about 10 mm (0.39 in) wide, the sepals about 6.5 mm (0.26 in) long and joined at the base, the upper two lobes joined above the middle. The petals are bluish-purple, the standard petal twice as long as the sepals and the wings shorter than the standard and the keel shorter than the wings. Flowering occurs from July to October and the fruit is an oval pod 8.5–10.5 mm (0.33–0.41 in) long.

== Taxonomy ==
Mirbelia floribunda was first formally described in 1839 by John Lindley in A Sketch of the Vegetation of the Swan River Colony from an unpublished manuscript by George Bentham. The specific epithet (floribunda) means "flowering profusely".

== Distribution and habitat ==
Purple mirbelia grows in woodland and kwongan and is found in the Avon Wheatbelt, Esperance Plains, Geraldton Sandplains, Jarrah Forest, Mallee and Swan Coastal Plain bioregions of south-western Western Australia.

== Conservation status ==
This species of pea is listed as "not threatened" by the Government of Western Australia Department of Biodiversity, Conservation and Attractions.
