= Mirbelia balsiformis =

Scientific classification
- Kingdom: Plantae
- Clade: Tracheophytes
- Clade: Angiosperms
- Clade: Eudicots
- Clade: Rosids
- Order: Fabales
- Family: Fabaceae
- Subfamily: Faboideae
- Genus: Mirbelia
- Species: M. balsiformis

Binomial name
- Mirbelia balsiformis Butcher

Species of legume

Mirbelia balsiformis is a species of flowering plant in the family Fabaceae and is endemic to the far west of Western Australia. It is an erect to sprawling shrub with leaves reduced to triangular scales, and yellow to orange and red flowers arranged in racemes on the side of the branchlets.

== Description ==
Mirbelia balsiformis is an erect to sprawling shrub that typically grows to 0.7–1.7 m (2 ft 4 in – 5 ft 7 in) high and 1.0–1.2 m (3 ft 3 in – 3 ft 11 in) wide and has erect, sharply-pointed and longitudinally-ridges branchlets. Its leaves are reduced to triangular scales 1.3–2 mm (0.051–0.079 in) long. The flowers are arranged in racemes, each flower on a pedicel 0.8–3.2 mm (0.031–0.126 in) long with egg-shaped bracts and bracteoles 0.6–1.2 mm (0.024–0.047 in) long. The sepals are 4.5–5.4 mm (0.18–0.21 in) long and joined at the base, the lobes overlapping each other, the lower three 1.5–2.6 mm (0.059–0.102 in) long. The standard petal is kidney-shaped with a notched centre, 6.5–6.8 mm (0.26–0.27 in) long, 7.9–10 mm (0.31–0.39 in) wide, and orange to yellow and red. The wings are egg-shaped, 4.8–5.7 mm (0.19–0.22 in) long and red with a yellow tip and a yellow base, the keel 1.6–2.3 mm (0.063–0.091 in) long and coloured like the wings. Flowering occurs from April to September and the fruit is an inflated, boat-shaped pod 7.2–11.7 mm (0.28–0.46 in) long.

== Taxonomy ==
Mirbelia balsiformis was first formally described in 2012 by Ryonen Butcher in the journal Nuytsia from specimens collected near Useless Loop Road near Denham in 1994. The specific epithet (balsiformis) is an allusion to pre-Columbian balsa boats, referring to the shape of the fruit.

== Distribution and habitat ==
This mirbelia grows on sandplains or low sand dunes in the area of Shark Bay to near Kalbarri in the Yalgoo bioregion of far western Western Australia.

== Conservation status ==
This mirbelia is listed as "not threatened" by the Government of Western Australia Department of Biodiversity, Conservation and Attractions,
