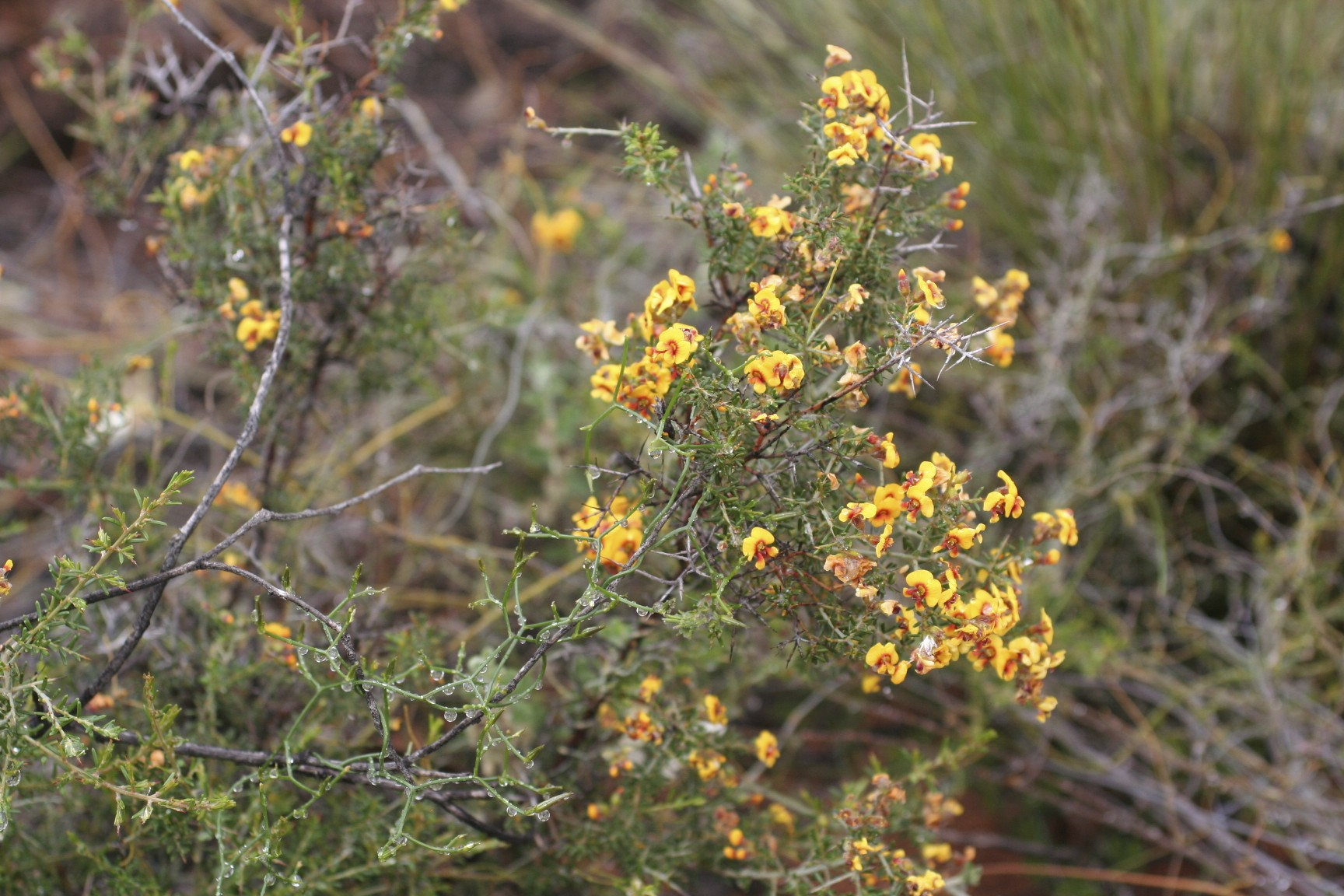
- Near Eurardy

Scientific classification
- Kingdom: Plantae
- Clade: Tracheophytes
- Clade: Angiosperms
- Clade: Eudicots
- Clade: Rosids
- Order: Fabales
- Family: Fabaceae
- Subfamily: Faboideae
- Genus: Mirbelia
- Species: M. depressa

Binomial name
- Mirbelia depressa E.Pritz.

= Mirbelia depressa =

Species of legume

Mirbelia depressa is a species of flowering plant in the family Fabaceae and is endemic to Western Australia. It is an erect or spreading, prickly shrub that typically grows to a height of 0.15–1 m (5.9 in – 3 ft 3.4 in) high and has yellow or orange and reddish-brown flowers from August to October. It was first formally described in 1904 by Ernst Georg Pritzel in the Botanische Jahrbücher für Systematik, Pflanzengeschichte und Pflanzengeographie. The specific epithet (depressa) means "pressed down", referring to the low habit of this species. This mirbelia grows on sandplains and is widespread in the Avon Wheatbelt, Coolgardie, Esperance Plains, Geraldton Sandplains, Gibson Desert, Great Victoria Desert, Mallee, Murchison and Yalgoo and bioregions of Western Australia, and is listed as "not threatened" by the Government of Western Australia Department of Biodiversity, Conservation and Attractions.
