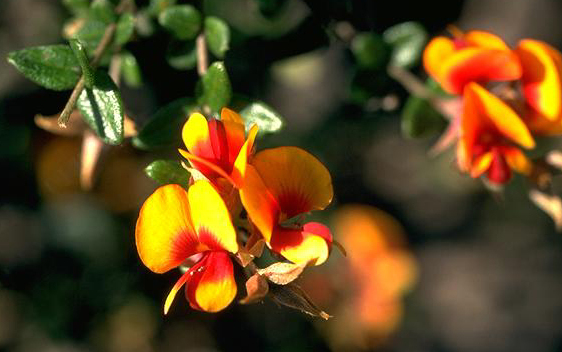

Scientific classification
- Kingdom: Plantae
- Clade: Tracheophytes
- Clade: Angiosperms
- Clade: Eudicots
- Clade: Rosids
- Order: Fabales
- Family: Fabaceae
- Subfamily: Faboideae
- Genus: Mirbelia
- Species: M. ovata

Binomial name
- Mirbelia ovata Meisn.

= Mirbelia ovata =

Species of legume

Mirbelia ovata is a species of flowering plant in the family Fabaceae and is endemic to the south-west of Western Australia. It is a spreading or prostrate shrub that typically grows to a height of 15–60 cm (5.9–23.6 in) and many branches, covered with woolly or shaggy hairs. Its leaves are egg-shaped, less than 12 mm (0.47 in) long and sharply-pointed. The flowers are arranged in pairs or threes at the base of branches and are yellow or orange and purple and appear from August to October. It was first formally described in 1844 by Carl Meissner in Lehmann's Plantae Preissianae. The specific epithet (ovata) means "wider below the middle".

This mirbelia grows on undulating plains in the Avon Wheatbelt, Esperance Plains, Jarrah Forest, Mallee and Warren bioregions of south-western Western Australia, and is listed as "not threatened" by the Government of Western Australia Department of Biodiversity, Conservation and Attractions.
