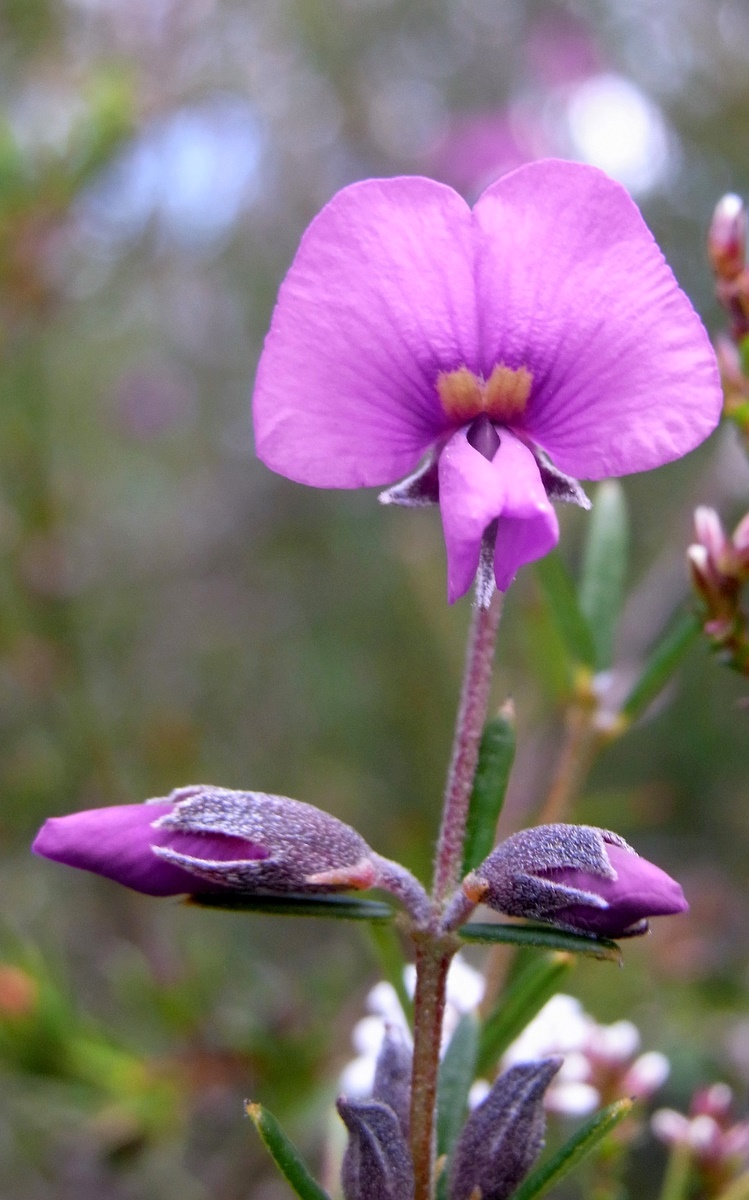
- Ku-ring-gai Chase National Park, Australia

Scientific classification
- Kingdom: Plantae
- Clade: Tracheophytes
- Clade: Angiosperms
- Clade: Eudicots
- Clade: Rosids
- Order: Fabales
- Family: Fabaceae
- Subfamily: Faboideae
- Genus: Mirbelia
- Species: M. speciosa

Binomial name
- Mirbelia speciosa Sieber ex DC.

= Mirbelia speciosa =

Species of legume

Mirbelia speciosa is a species of flowering plant in the family Fabaceae and is endemic to eastern Australia. It is an erect shrub with narrowly linear leaves arranged in whorls of three, and bluish-purple flowers usually arranged singly in leaf axils.

== Description ==
Mirbelia speciosa is an erect shrub that typically grows to a height of up to about 1 m (3 ft 3 in) and has angular stems. Its leaves are arranged in whorls of three, and are narrowly linear, 10–30 mm (0.39–1.18 in) long, 2–4 mm (0.079–0.157 in) long and sharply pointed, the edges rolled under. The flowers are mostly arranged in leaf axils, the sepals are 6–8 mm (0.24–0.31 in) long, silky-hairy and joined at the base to form a tube with tapering teeth about as long as the tube. The petals are 8–13 mm (0.31–0.51 in) long and bluish-purple, often with a yellowish mark near the base of the standard petal. Flowering occurs in July and August and the fruit is an oval pod 8–15 mm (0.31–0.59 in) long.

== Taxonomy ==
Mirbelia speciosa was first formally described in 1825 by Augustin Pyramus de Candolle Augustin Pyramus de Candolle in his Prodromus Systematis Naturalis Regni Vegetabilis from an unpublished description by Franz Sieber. The specific epithet “speciosa” means "showy", referring to flowers.

In 1977, Leslie Pedley reduced M. ringrosei F.M.Bailey to M. speciosa subsp. ringrosei in the journal Austrobaileya, and the name and that of the autonym (subsp. speciosa), are accepted by the Australian Plant Census:

- Mirbelia speciosa subsp. ringrosei (F.M.Bailey) Pedley has bracteoles longer than the sepal tube, and leaves mostly 20–30 mm (0.79–1.18 in) long.
- Mirbelia speciosa (F.M.Bailey) Pedley subsp. speciosa has bracteoles shorter than the sepal tube, and leaves mostly 10–20 mm (0.39–0.79 in) long.

== Distribution and habitat ==
This mirbelia grows in heath, woodland and forest north from the Illawarra region in New South Wales to north Queensland.

== Use in horticulture ==
This species is not recommended for clay soils that are not well drained or sites with excessive frost. A sunny situation is preferred, though it does better with a small amount of shade. Fertilizers may be used, but are only recommended if they have a low pH (higher acid) levels.

This plant strikes easily from tip cuttings. Alternatively, seed propagation is also successful. Seeds may be treated by very hot (but not boiling) water for two minutes. After drying overnight, they should be planted and placed in a sunny situation. Germination usually occurs within two weeks.
