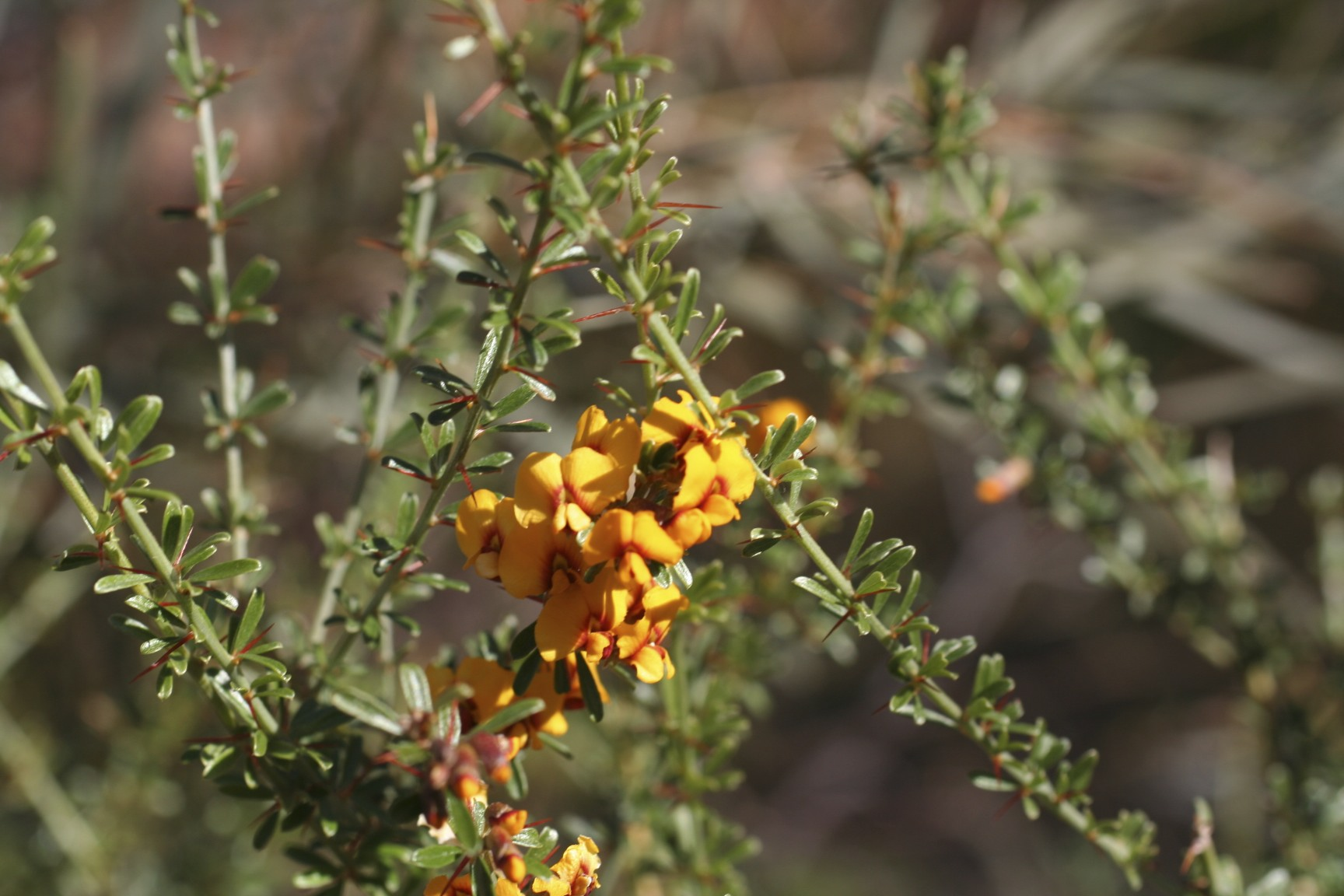

Scientific classification
- Kingdom: Plantae
- Clade: Embryophytes
- Clade: Tracheophytes
- Clade: Spermatophytes
- Clade: Angiosperms
- Clade: Eudicots
- Clade: Rosids
- Order: Fabales
- Family: Fabaceae
- Subfamily: Faboideae
- Genus: Mirbelia
- Species: M. microphylla

Binomial name
- Mirbelia microphylla (Turcz.) Benth.

= Mirbelia microphylla =

Species of legume

Mirbelia microphylla is a species of flowering plant in the family Fabaceae and is endemic to Western Australia. It is an erect shrub with many branches that typically grows to a height of 15–100 cm (5.9–39.4 in) and has yellow and red flowers from August to October. It was first formally described in 1853 by Nikolai Turczaninow who gave it the name ''Dichosema microphyllum in the Bulletin de la Société Impériale des Naturalistes de Moscou. In 1864, George Bentham changed the name to Mirbelia microphylla in Flora Australiensis. The specific epithet (microphylla) means "small-leaved".

This mirbelia grows on sandy and gravelly soils on sandplains, granite hills and outcrops in the Avon Wheatbelt, Coolgardie, Esperance Plains, Geraldton Sandplains Great Victoria Desert Mallee, Murchison and Yalgoo bioregions of Western Australia, and is listed as "not threatened" by the Government of Western Australia Department of Biodiversity, Conservation and Attractions.

Mirbelia microphylla

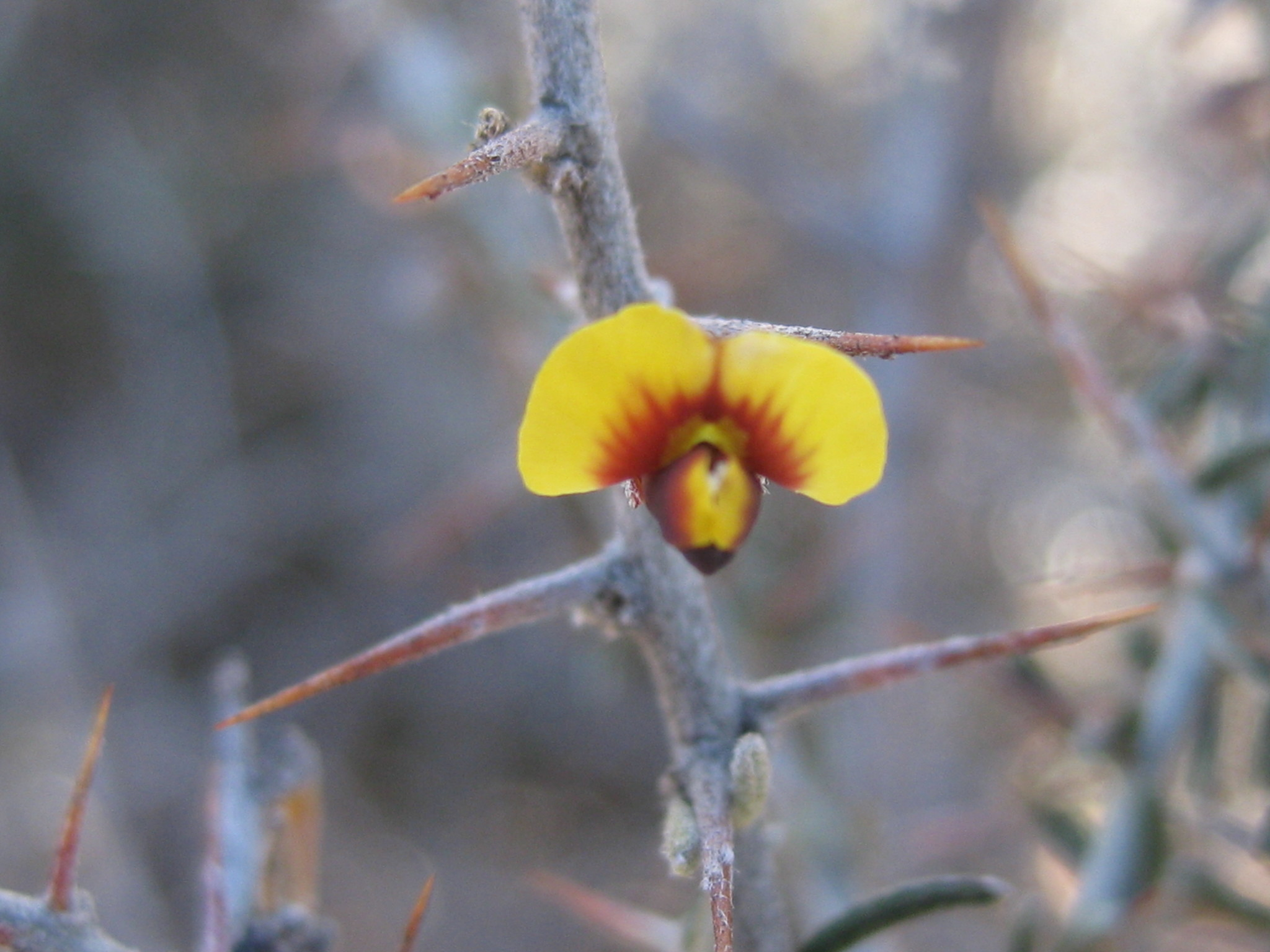

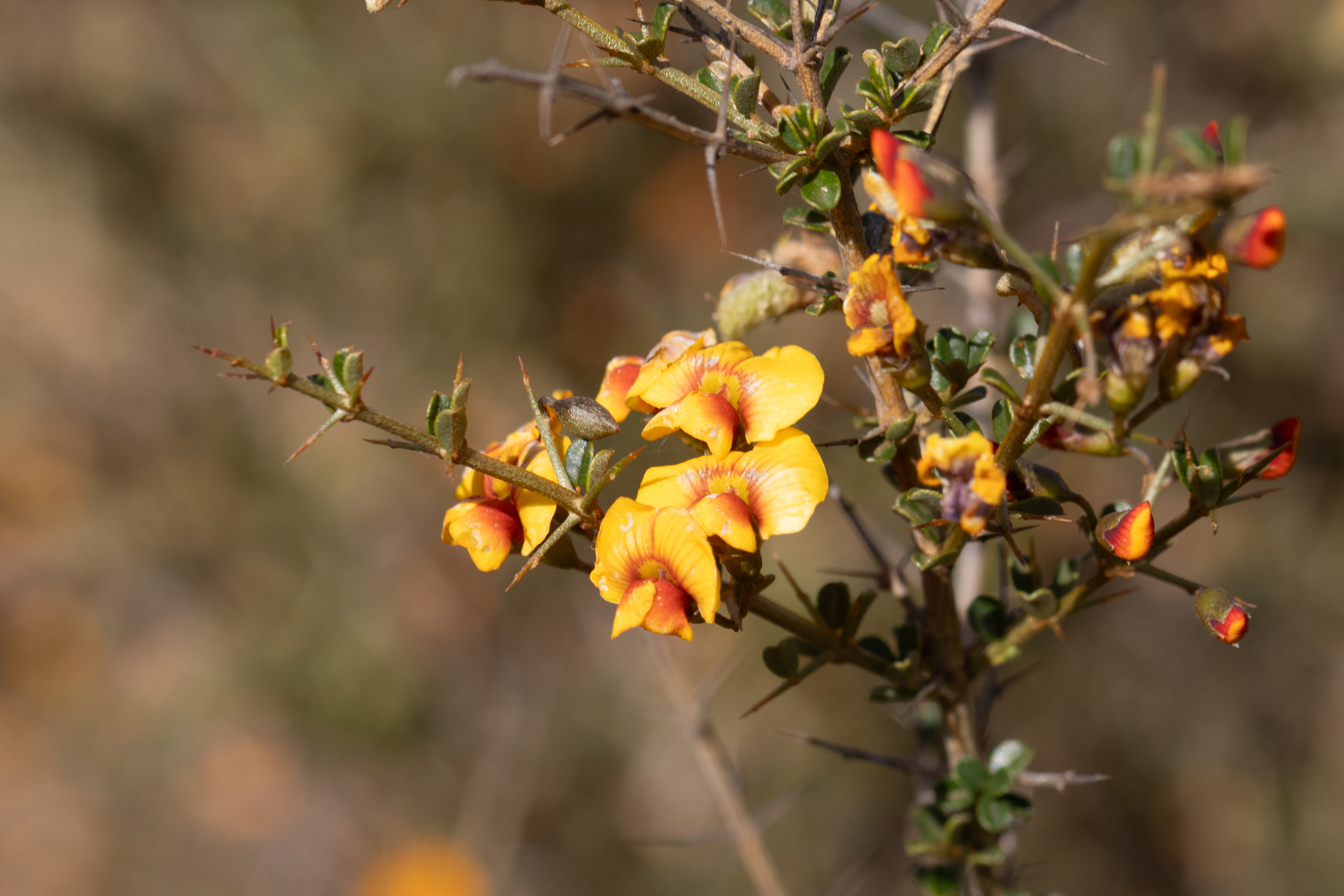

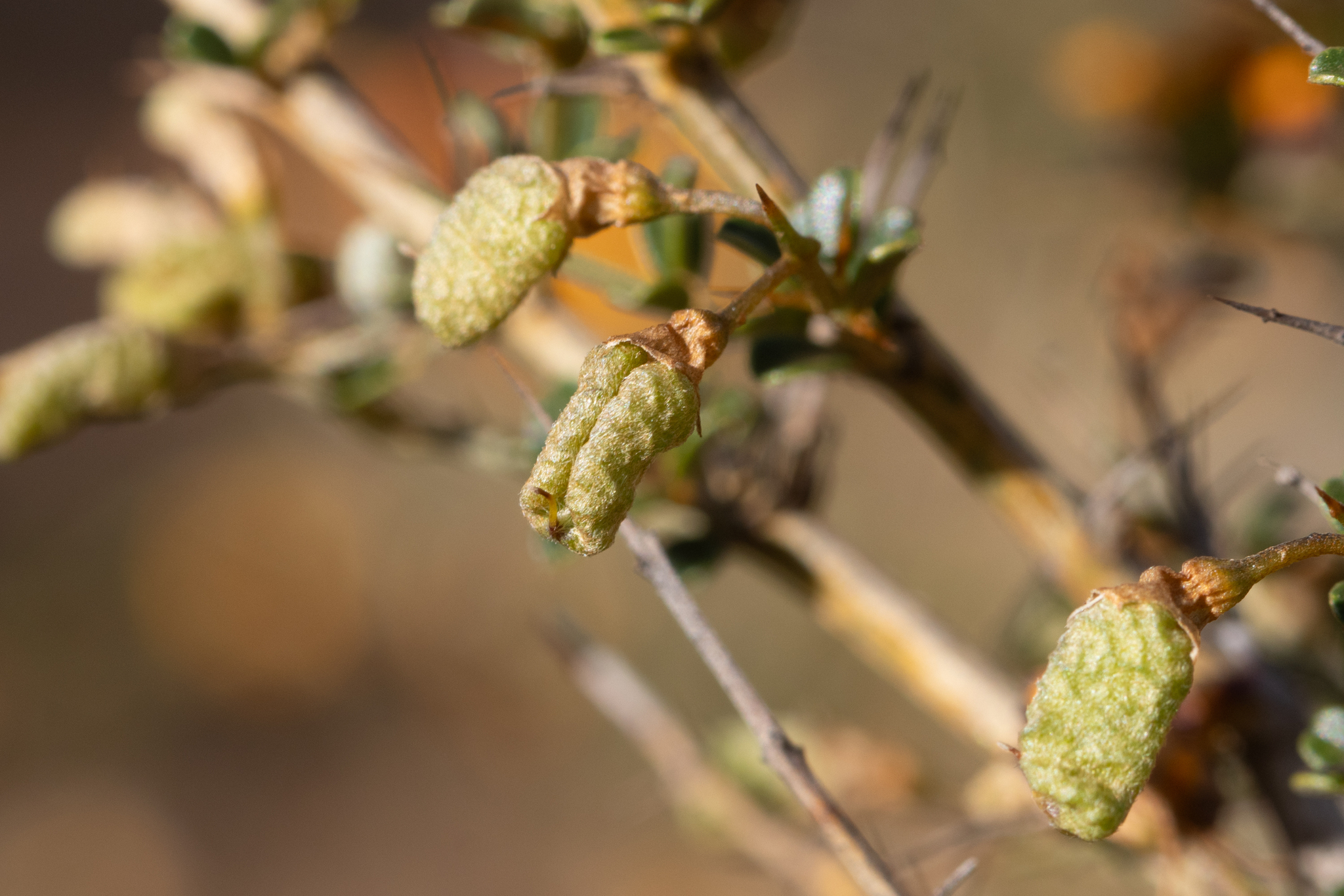

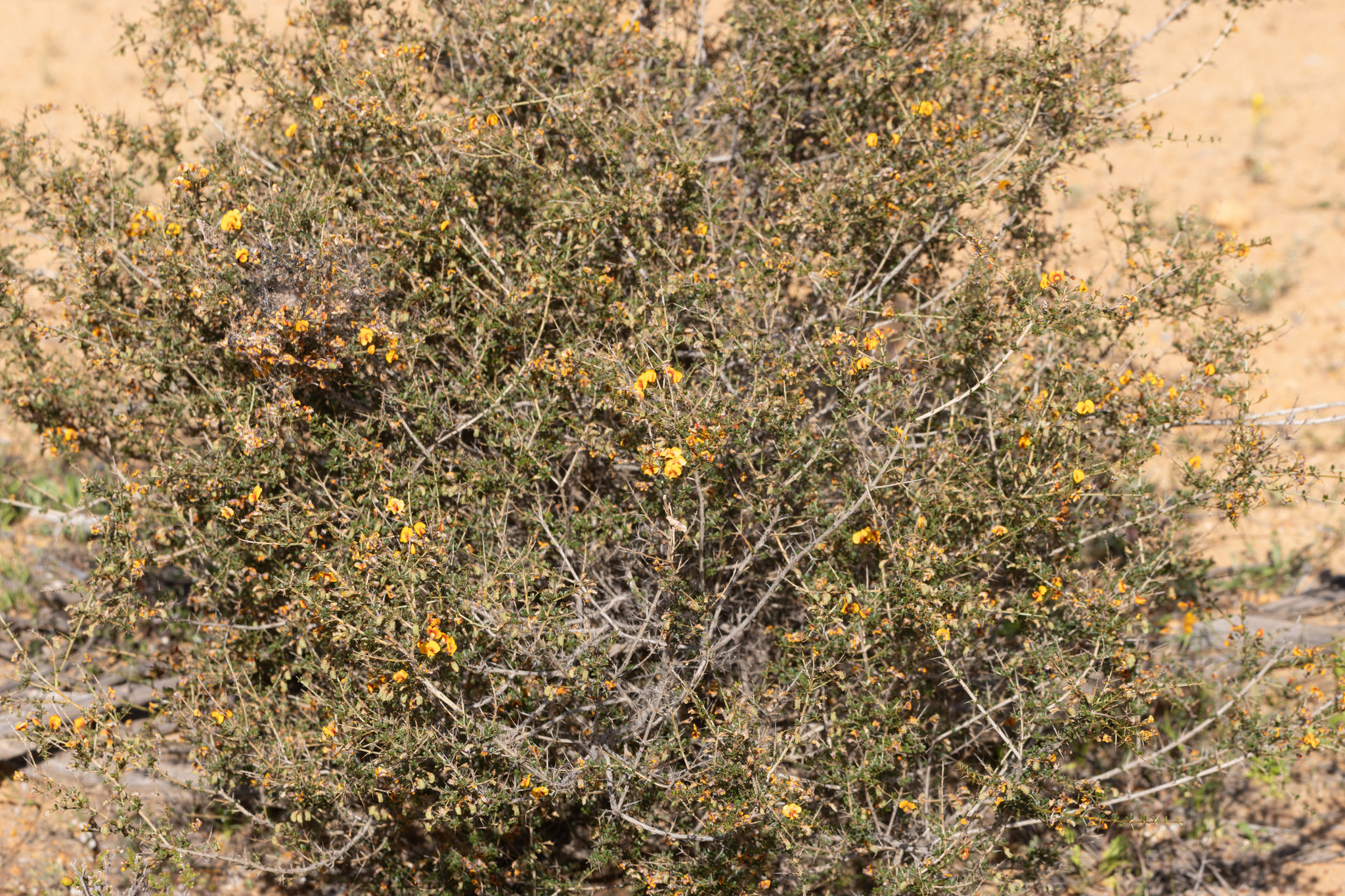
