= Mirbelia rhagodioides =

Scientific classification
- Kingdom: Plantae
- Clade: Tracheophytes
- Clade: Angiosperms
- Clade: Eudicots
- Clade: Rosids
- Order: Fabales
- Family: Fabaceae
- Subfamily: Faboideae
- Genus: Mirbelia
- Species: M. rhagodioides

Binomial name
- Mirbelia rhagodioides Crisp & J.M.Taylor

Species of plant

Mirbelia rhagodioides is a species of flowering plant in the family Fabaceae and is endemic to inland areas of Western Australia. It is an erect, prickly shrub with clustered linear or narrowly elliptic leaves and yellow and red flowers.

== Description ==
Mirbelia rhagodioides is an erect, prickly shrub that typically grows to a height of 0.5–1 m (1 ft 8 in – 3 ft 3 in) and has its branches and young leaves covered with woolly hairs. Its leaves are mostly clustered, linear or narrowly elliptic, 3–9 mm (0.12–0.35 in) long and 0.5–0.75 mm (0.020–0.030 in) long with the edges rolled under. The flowers are arranged singly in leaf axils on a pedicel 1–2 mm (0.039–0.079 in) long with tiny bracts and bracteoles but that fall off as the flowers open. The sepals are 3–4 mm (0.12–0.16 in) long and joined at the base, the upper two lobes forming a notched "lip". The standard petal is broadly kidney-shaped, 5.5–7.0 mm (0.22–0.28 in) long, 5.0–7.5 mm (0.20–0.30 in) wide and yellow with a dark red base. The wings are 5–6 mm (0.20–0.24 in) long and mostly yellow and the keel 4.5–5.5 mm (0.18–0.22 in) long and dark red. Flowering occurs from June to August and the fruit is a broadly egg-shaped, ribbed pod about 6 mm (0.24 in) long.

== Taxonomy ==
Mirbelia rhagodioides was first formally described in 1987 by Michael Crisp and Joan M. Taylor in the Journal of the Adelaide Botanic Gardens from specimens collected near Laverton in 1931. The specific epithet (rhagodioides) means "Rhagodia-like".

== Distribution and habitat ==
This mirbelia grows in shrubland on rocky hills and outcrops in the Avon Wheatbelt, Coolgardie, Gascoyne, Great Victoria Desert, Little Sandy Desert, Murchison and Yalgoo bioregions of inland Western Australia.

== Conservation status ==
Mirbelia rhagodioides is listed as "not threatened" by the Government of Western Australia Department of Biodiversity, Conservation and Attractions.
