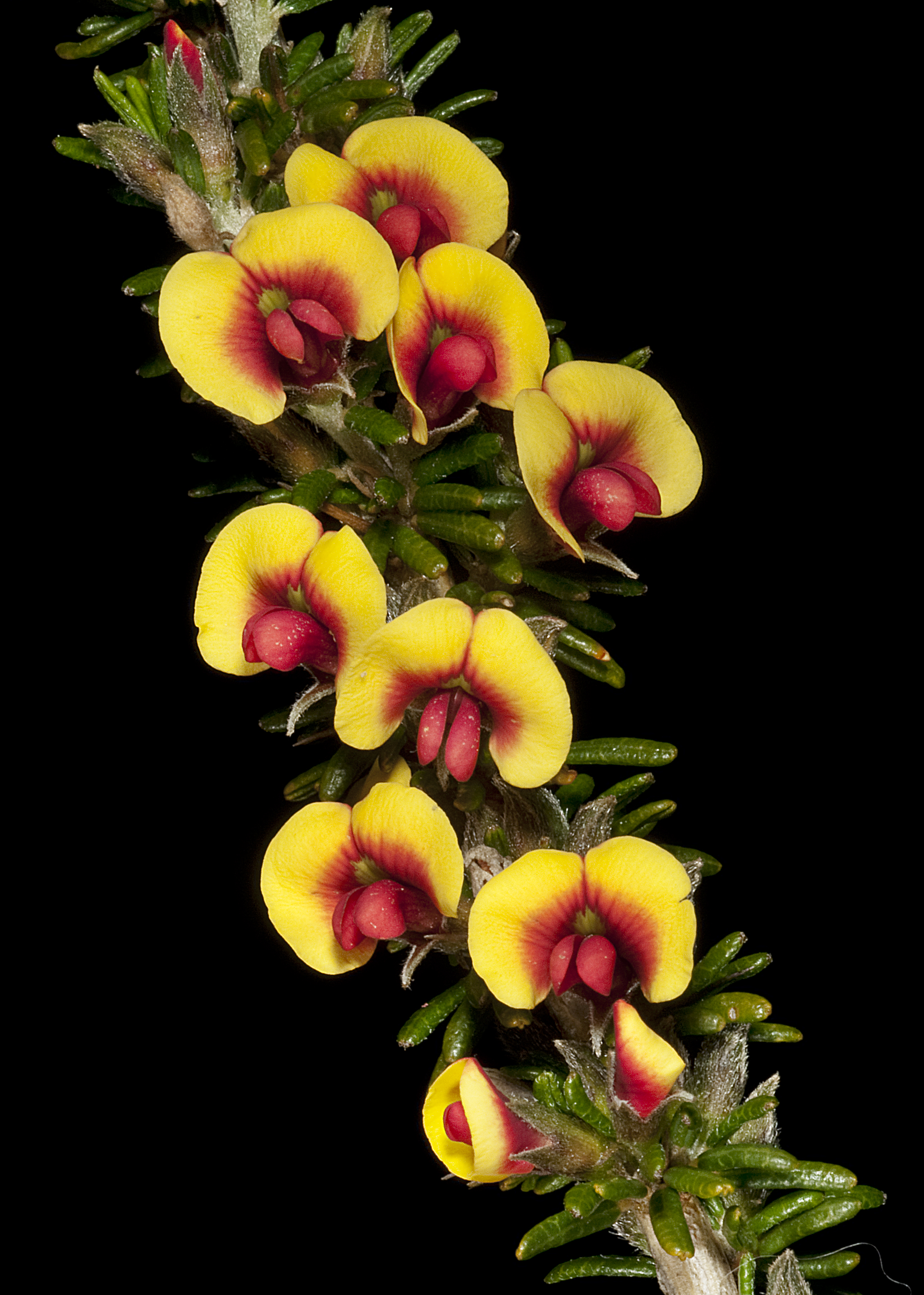

Scientific classification
- Kingdom: Plantae
- Clade: Tracheophytes
- Clade: Angiosperms
- Clade: Eudicots
- Clade: Rosids
- Order: Fabales
- Family: Fabaceae
- Subfamily: Faboideae
- Genus: Mirbelia
- Species: M. spinosa

Binomial name
- Mirbelia spinosa (Benth.) Benth.

Synonyms
- Dichosema spinosum Benth. Mirbelia spinosa (Benth.) Benth. f. spinosa Diels & E.Pritz.

= Mirbelia spinosa =

Plant species

Mirbelia spinosa is a species of flowering plant in the family Fabaceae and is endemic to the south-west of Western Australia. It is a spiny shrub with narrowly linear leaves and yellow, orange and reddish-brown flowers.

== Description ==
Mirbelia spinosa is a spiny shrub that typically grows to a height of 0.2–1.5 m (7.9 in – 4 ft 11.1 in) and has erect or wand-like branches. The leaves are narrowly linear, less than 12 mm (0.47 in) long with the edges rolled under, and clustered around rigid thorns. The flowers are arranged singly in leaf axils and are sessile, the sepals about 6 mm (0.24 in) long, softly-hairy and joined at the base, the lobes nearly as long as the sepal tube. The petals are yellow, orange and reddish-brown, the standard petal almost twice as long as the sepals, the wings shorter than the standard and the keel shorter still. Flowering occurs from June to November.

== Taxonomy ==
This species was first formally described in 1837 by George Bentham who gave it the name Dichosema spinosum in Stephan Endlicher's Enumeratio plantarum quas in Novae Hollandiae ora austro-occidentali ad fluvium Cygnorum et in sinu Regis Georgii collegit Carolus Liber Baro de Hügel from specimens collected at King George Sound. In 1864, Bentham changed the name to Mirbelia spinosa in Flora Australiensis. The specific epithet (spinosa) means "spiny", referring to the "thorns, (abortive branchlets)".

== Distribution and habitat ==
Mirbelia spinosa grows on sandy soil on plains, hills, ridges and on granite in the Avon Wheatbelt, Carnarvon, Esperance Plains, Geraldton Sandplains, Jarrah Forest, Mallee, Murchison and Swan Coastal Plain bioregions of south-western Western Australia.
