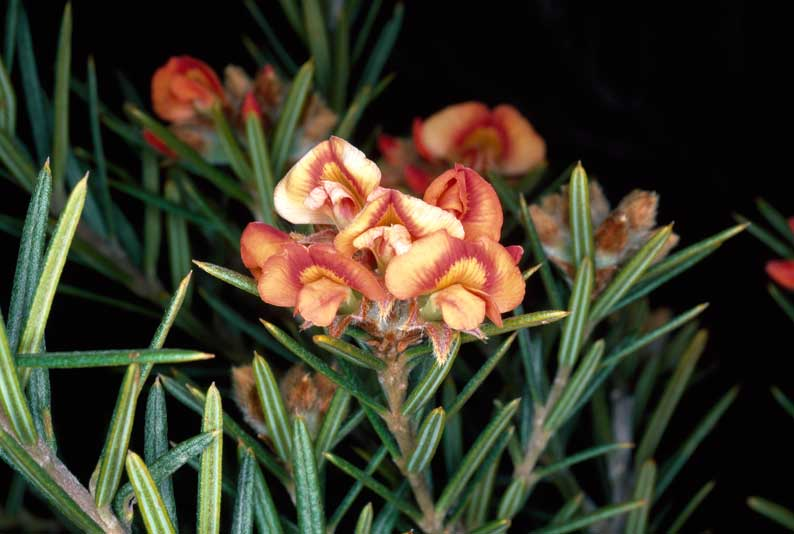
- In the Gibraltar Range National Park

Scientific classification
- Kingdom: Plantae
- Clade: Embryophytes
- Clade: Tracheophytes
- Clade: Spermatophytes
- Clade: Angiosperms
- Clade: Eudicots
- Clade: Rosids
- Order: Fabales
- Family: Fabaceae
- Subfamily: Faboideae
- Genus: Mirbelia
- Species: M. confertiflora

Binomial name
- Mirbelia confertiflora Pedley

= Mirbelia confertiflora =

Species of legume

Mirbelia confertiflora is a species of flowering plant in the family Fabaceae and is endemic to eastern Australia. It is a rigid, bushy shrub with linear leaves and yellow to orange flowers arranged in racemes near the end of the branches.

== Description ==
Mirbelia confertiflora is a rigid, bush shrub that typically grows to a height of up to 2.5 m (8 ft 2 in), its stems with a few silky hairs pressed against the surface. Its leaves are linear, mostly 15–25 mm (0.59–0.98 in) long, 1.5–3 mm (0.059–0.118 in) wide on a petiole about 1.5 mm (0.059 in) long, and sharply-pointed with the edges rolled under. The flowers are arranged in racemes on the ends of branches or in upper leaf axils, and have narrowly lance-shaped bracts and bracteoles at the base. The sepals are 6–7 mm (0.24–0.28 in) long, densely hairy and joined at the base, the lobes 3.5–4 mm (0.14–0.16 in) long. The petals are yellow-orange, the standard petal 4–5.5 mm (0.16–0.22 in) long and 10 mm (0.39 in) wide, the wings 5.6 mm (0.22 in) long and the keel 3.5–4.5 mm (0.14–0.18 in) long. The fruit is an oval pod 5–7 mm (0.20–0.28 in) long.

== Taxonomy ==
Mirbelia confertiflora was first formally described in 1977 by Leslie Pedley in the journal Austrobaileya from specimens he collected at Jolly's Falls near Stanthorpe in 1963. The specific epithet (confertiflora) means "crowded-flowered".

== Distribution and habitat ==
This mirbelia grows in forest and heath on granite and is only known from the Boonoo Boonoo National Park in Queensland and the Gibraltar Range National Park in New South Wales.

== Conservation status ==
Mirbelia confertiflora is listed as "near threatened" under the Queensland Government Nature Conservation Act 1992.

Mirbelia confertiflora

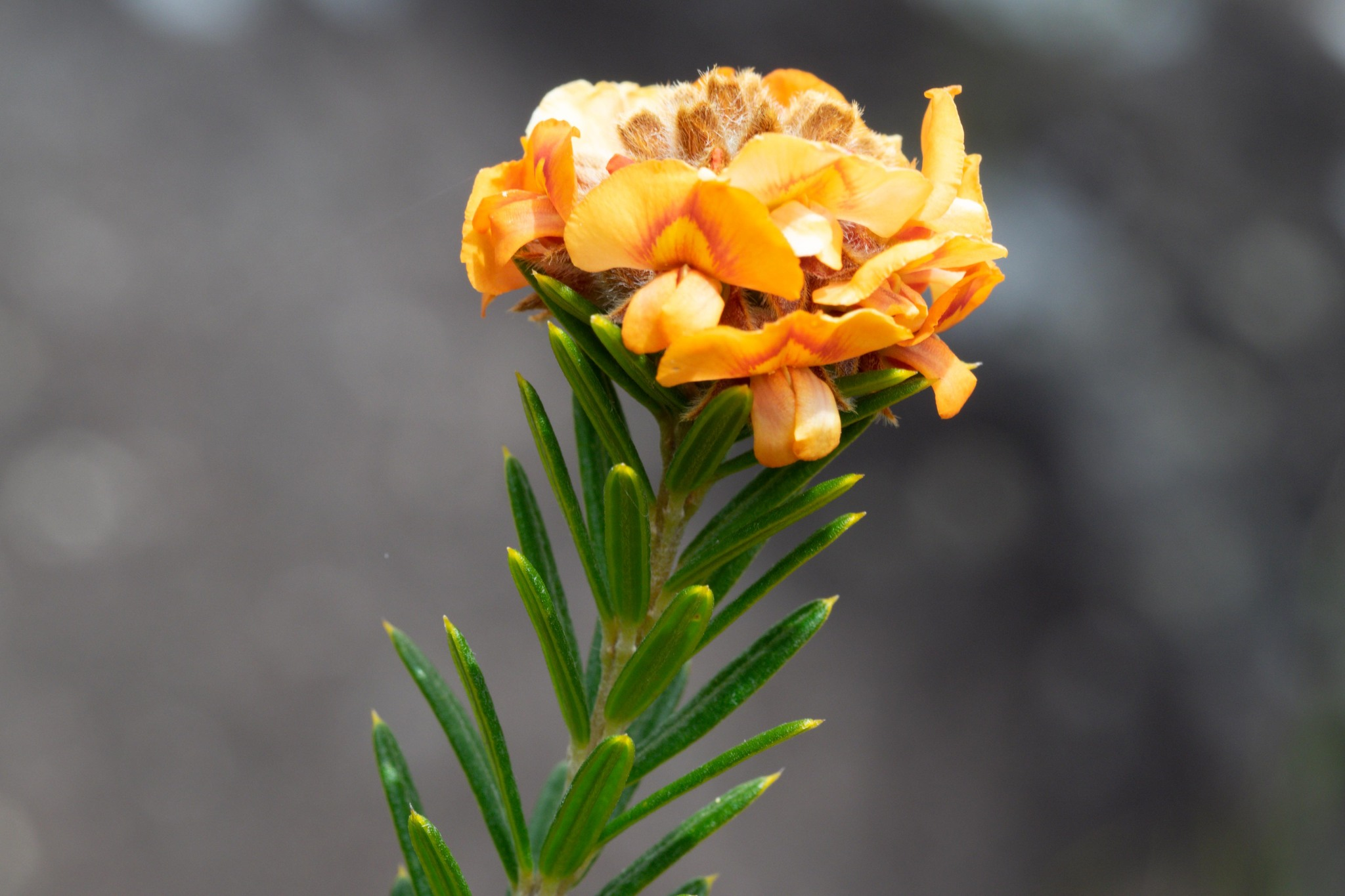

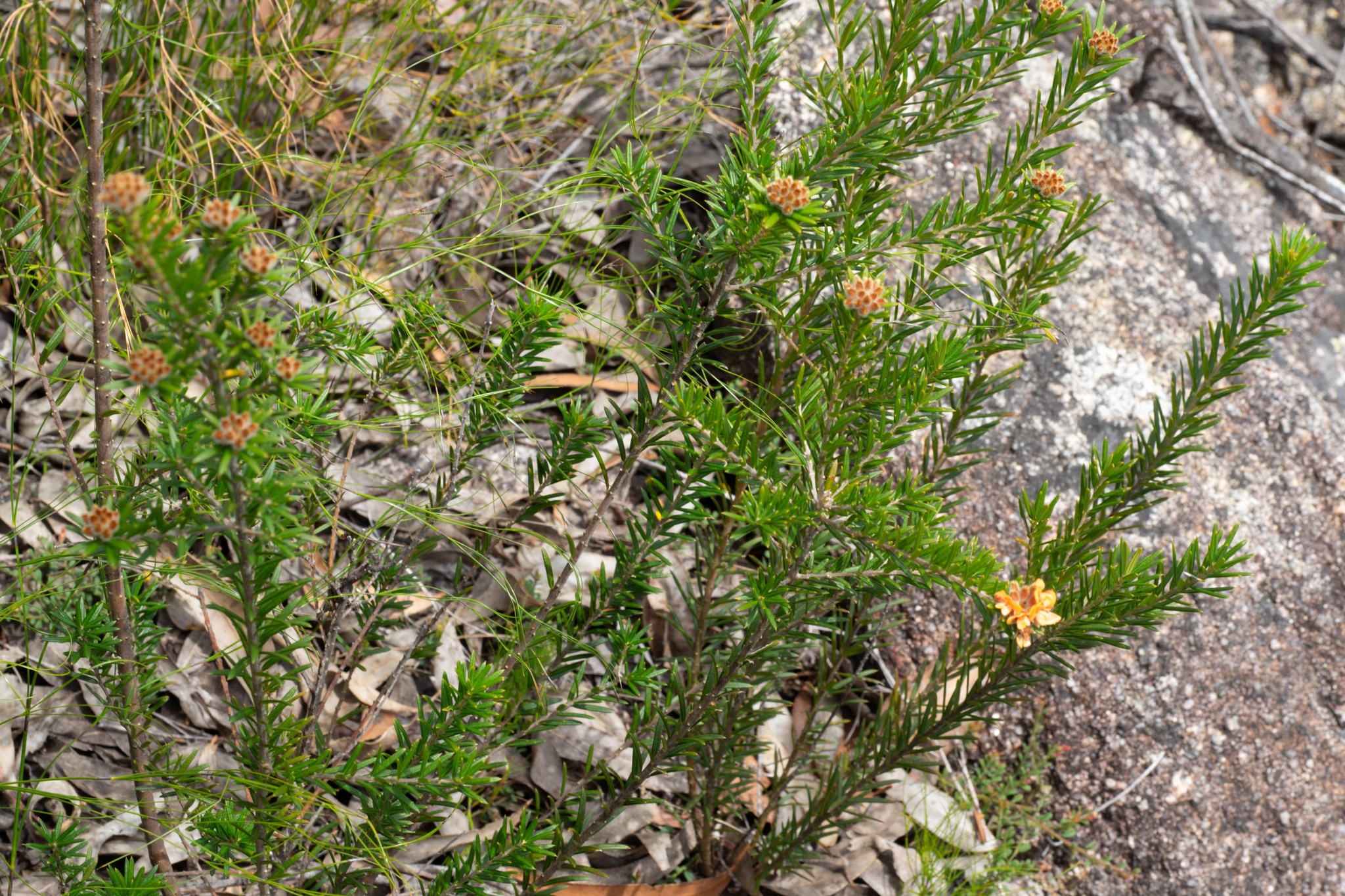

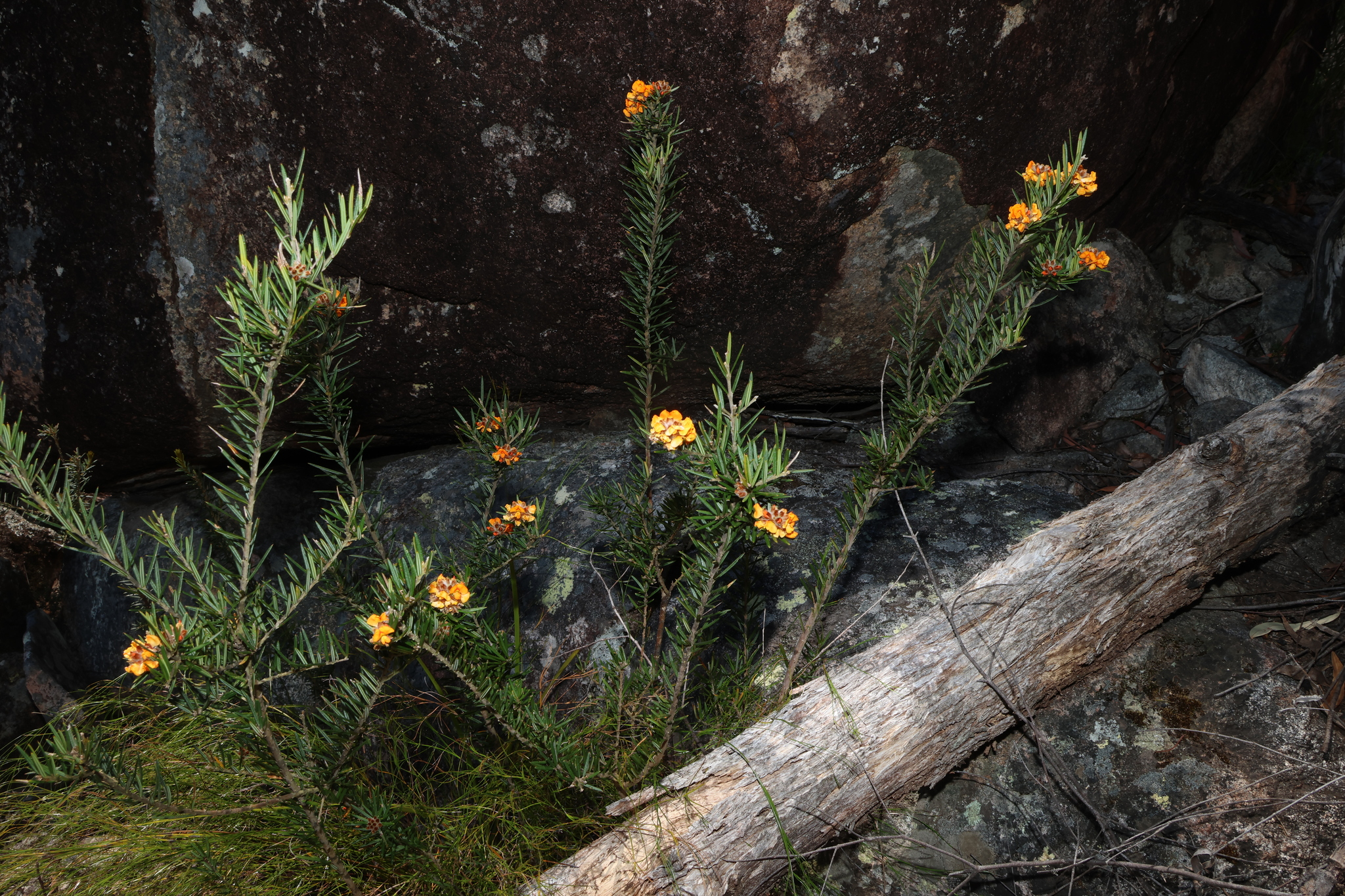

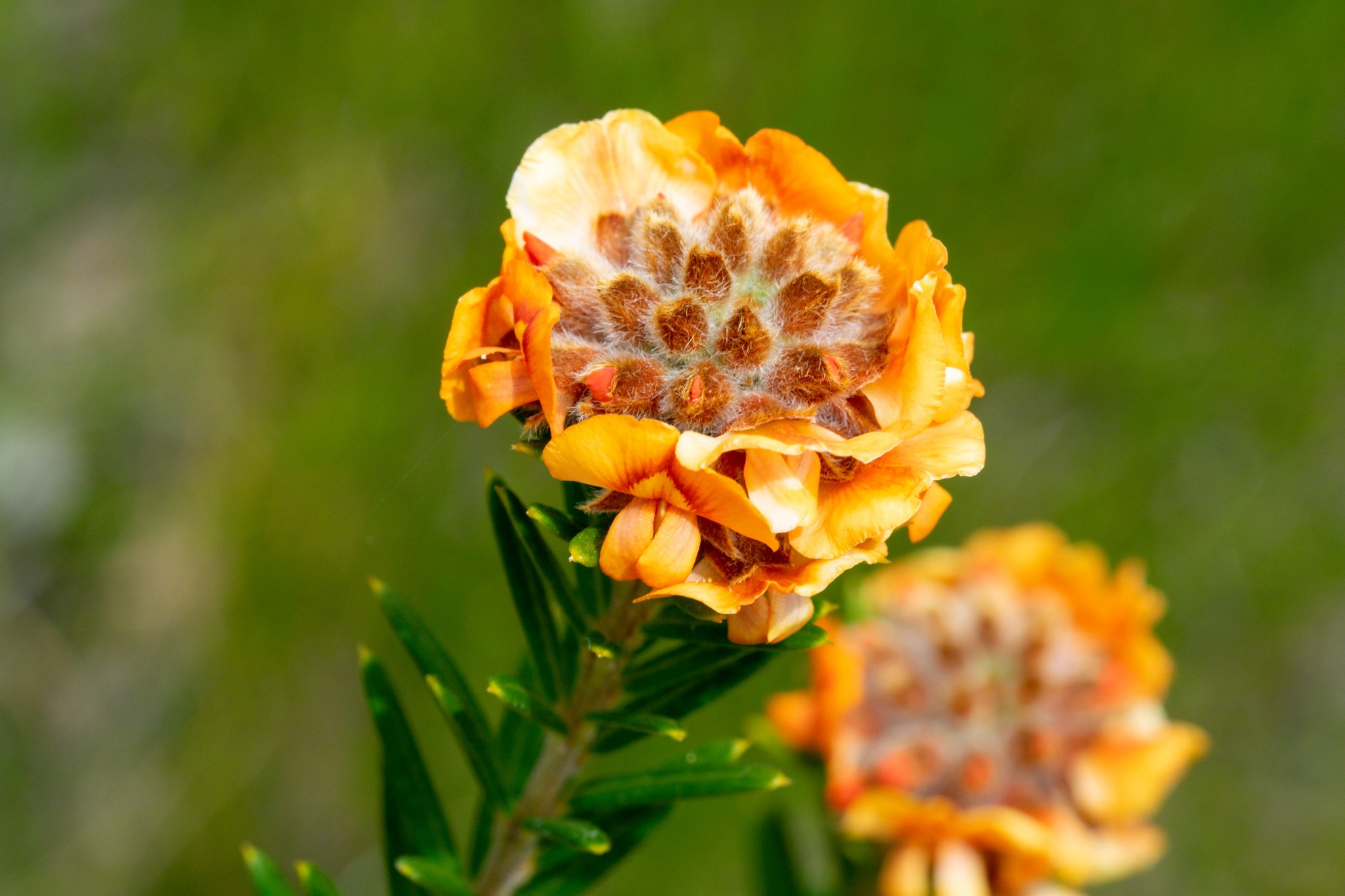
