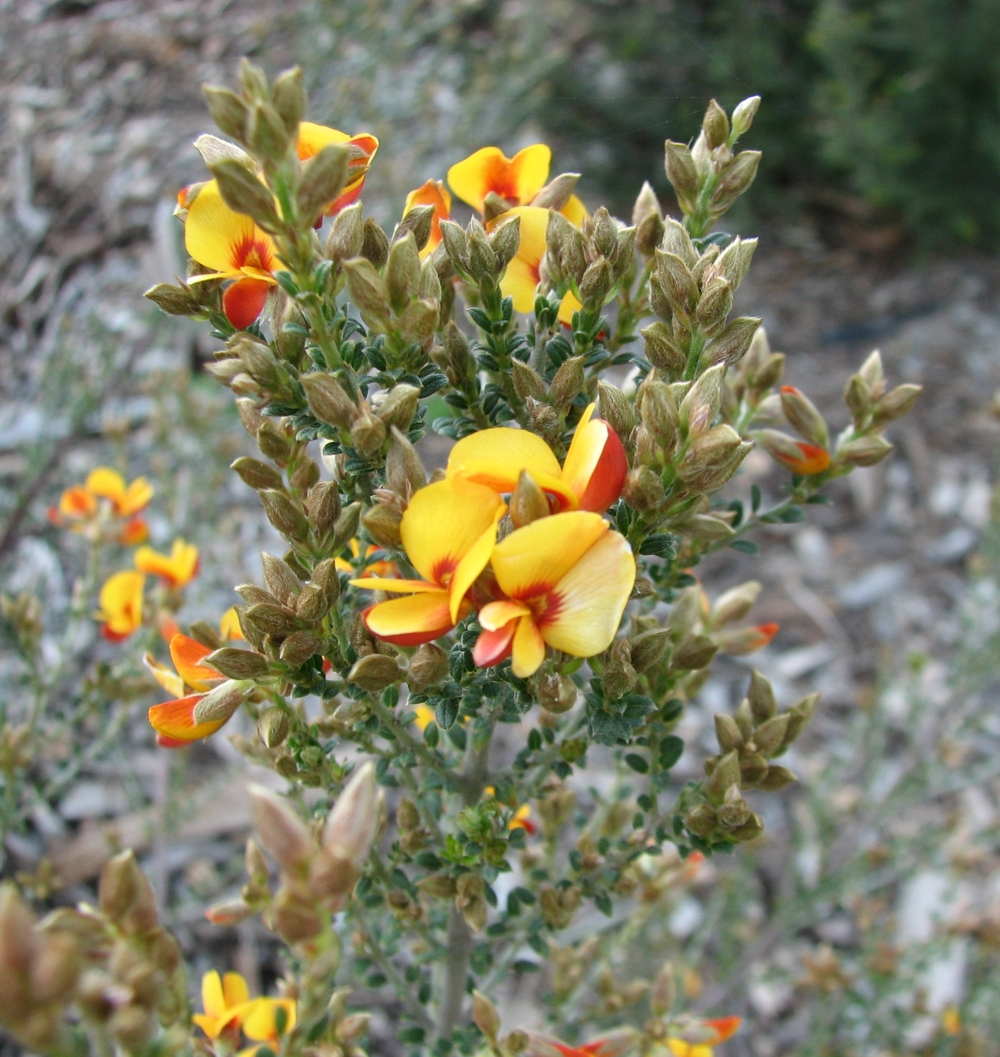
- In the Royal Botanic Gardens Melbourne

Scientific classification
- Kingdom: Plantae
- Clade: Tracheophytes
- Clade: Angiosperms
- Clade: Eudicots
- Clade: Rosids
- Order: Fabales
- Family: Fabaceae
- Subfamily: Faboideae
- Genus: Mirbelia
- Species: M. oxylobioides

Binomial name
- Mirbelia oxylobioides F.Muell.

= Mirbelia oxylobioides =

Species of legume

Mirbelia oxylobioides, commonly known as mountain mirbelia or sandstone bushpea, is a species of flowering plant in the family Fabaceae and is endemic to south-eastern Australia. It is a low-lying or erect shrub with narrowly elliptic to egg-shaped leaves and orange-yellow and reddish-purple flowers arranged near the end of the branches.

== Description ==
Mirbelia oxyloboides is a low-lying or erect shrub that typically grows to a height of 1.5–3 m (4 ft 11 in – 9 ft 10 in), its stems covered with soft downy hairs pressed against the surface. Its leaves are narrowly elliptic to egg-shaped or oblong, 2–10 mm (0.079–0.394 in) long, 1.4 mm (0.055 in) wide on a petiole up to 0.5 mm (0.020 in) long. The flowers are arranged in small groups on the ends of branches, each flower on a pedicel up to 4 mm (0.16 in) long. The sepals are 5–6 mm (0.20–0.24 in) long, silky-hairy and joined at the base, the lobes about the same length as the sepal tube. The petals are 8–10 mm (0.31–0.39 in) long, the standard petal more or less round and orange-yellow with red markings, and the keel rust-coloured to purplish-red and about the same length as the wings. Flowering mostly occurs from October to January and the fruit is an oval to oblong pod 8–10 mm (0.31–0.39 in) long.

== Taxonomy ==
Mirbelia oxylobioides was first formally described by botanist Ferdinand von Mueller in Fragmenta Phytographiae Australiae in 1861. The specific epithet (oxylobioides) means "Oxylobium-like".

== Distribution and habitat ==
Mountain mirbelia grows in shrubby woodland in mountainous country in south-eastern New South Wales, eastern Victoria and near Elderslie in Tasmania.

== Conservation status ==
In Tasmania, sandstone bushpea is only found in the Heathy Hills Nature Reserve near Elderslie and is classified as "vulnerable" under Tasmania's Threatened Species Protection Act 1995. It is threatened by the effects of drought and by the invasion of gorse.
