= Mirbelia corallina =

Scientific classification
- Kingdom: Plantae
- Clade: Tracheophytes
- Clade: Angiosperms
- Clade: Eudicots
- Clade: Rosids
- Order: Fabales
- Family: Fabaceae
- Subfamily: Faboideae
- Genus: Mirbelia
- Species: M. corallina

Binomial name
- Mirbelia corallina Butcher

Species of legume

Mirbelia corallina is a species of flowering plant in the family Fabaceae and is endemic to the far west of Western Australia. It is a slender, sprawling sub-shrub with a few narrowly elliptic to narrowly egg-shaped leaves and pink and yellow flowers arranged in racemes near the ends of the branchlets.

== Description ==
Mirbelia corallina is a slender, sprawling sub-shrub that typically grows up to 1 m (3 ft 3 in) high and 0.6 m (2 ft 0 in) wide. Its leaves are scattered, narrowly elliptic to narrowly egg-shaped with the narrower end towards the base, 3.8–7.2 mm (0.15–0.28 in) long and 0.7–1.8 mm (0.028–0.071 in) wide, some reduced to triangular scale-leaves 0.8–1.6 mm (0.031–0.063 in) long and 0.2–0.6 mm (0.0079–0.0236 in) wide. The flowers are arranged in racemes near the ends of branchlets, each flower on a pedicel 2.5–3.5 mm (0.098–0.138 in) long with egg-shaped bracts and bracteoles 0.8–1.65 mm (0.031–0.065 in) long. The sepals are 6.0–9.6 mm (0.24–0.38 in) long and joined at the base, the lower three lobes 2.7–5.8 mm (0.11–0.23 in) long. The standard petal is broadly kidney-shaped with a shallowly notched centre, 6.5–6.8 mm (0.26–0.27 in) long, 9.5–13.4 mm (0.37–0.53 in) wide and coral- to apricot-pink with a yellow centre. The wings are egg-shaped, 7.2–8.7 mm (0.28–0.34 in) long and pink, the keel 5.0–5.6 mm (0.20–0.22 in) long and yellow. Flowering occurs from August to October and the fruit is an inflated, oval to elliptic pod about 6.8 mm (0.27 in) long.

== Taxonomy ==
Mirbelia corallina was first formally described in 2012 by Ryonen Butcher in the journal Nuytsia from specimens collected in Kalbarri National Park in 2008. The specific epithet (corallina) means "coral-coloured", referring to the distinctive colour of the flowers.

== Distribution and habitat ==
This mirbelia grows on sandplains and winter-wet places in kwongan and shrubland near Kalbarri and mostly in Kalbarri National Park, in the Geraldton Sandplains bioregion of western, Western Australia.

== Conservation status ==
This mirbelia is listed as "Priority Three" by the Government of Western Australia Department of Biodiversity, Conservation and Attractions, meaning that it is poorly known and known from only a few locations but is not under imminent threat.
