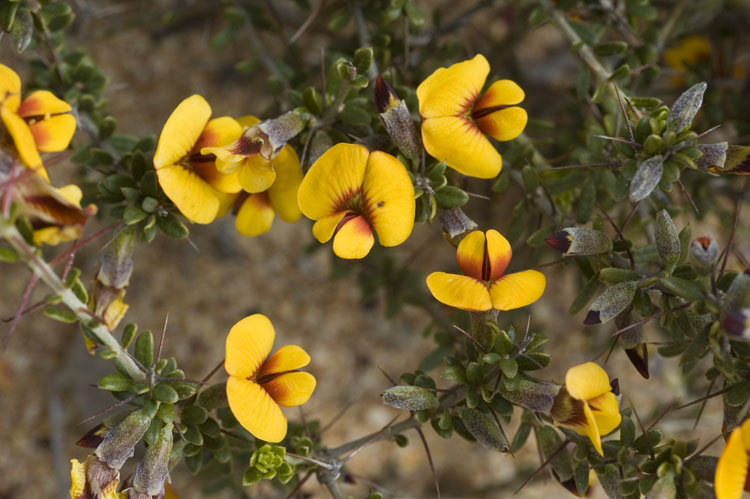
- Near Lake King

Scientific classification
- Kingdom: Plantae
- Clade: Tracheophytes
- Clade: Angiosperms
- Clade: Eudicots
- Clade: Rosids
- Order: Fabales
- Family: Fabaceae
- Subfamily: Faboideae
- Genus: Mirbelia
- Species: M. multicaulis

Binomial name
- Mirbelia multicaulis (Turcz.) Benth.

= Mirbelia multicaulis =

Species of flowering plant

Mirbelia multicaulis is a species of flowering plant in the family Fabaceae and is endemic to the south-west of Western Australia. It is an erect, rigid shrub that typically grows to a height of 15–50 cm (5.9–19.7 in) and has erect stems with few branches. It has scattered, egg-shaped to oblong leaves 4–6 mm (0.16–0.24 in) long and spines that are longer than the leaves. The flowers are arranged in clusters in leaf axils or at the base of the spines and are yellow or orange and reddish-brown and appear in September and October. It was first formally described in 1853 by Nikolai Turczaninow who gave it the name Dichosema multicaule in the Bulletin de la Société Impériale des Naturalistes de Moscou. In 1864, George Bentham changed the name to Mirbelia multicaulis in Flora Australiensis. The specific epithet (multicaulis) means "many stems".

This mirbelia grows on sandy soils on sandplains in the Avon Wheatbelt, Coolgardie, Esperance Plains, Jarrah Forest and Mallee bioregions of Western Australia, and is listed as "not threatened" by the Government of Western Australia Department of Biodiversity, Conservation and Attractions.
