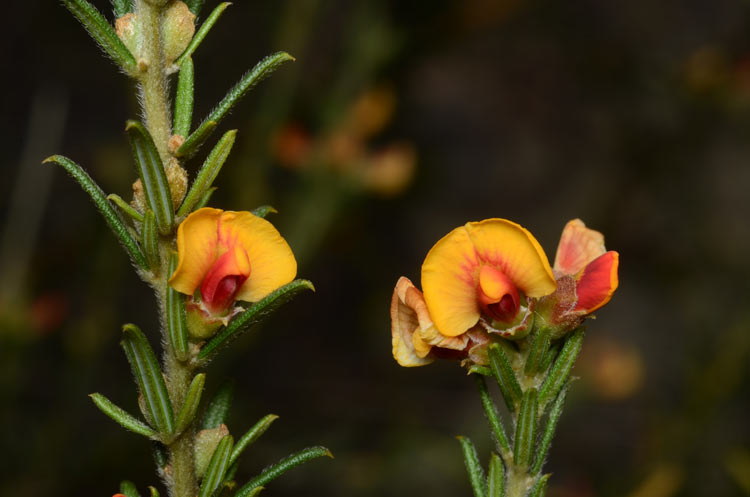
- In Expedition National Park

Scientific classification
- Kingdom: Plantae
- Clade: Tracheophytes
- Clade: Angiosperms
- Clade: Eudicots
- Clade: Rosids
- Order: Fabales
- Family: Fabaceae
- Subfamily: Faboideae
- Genus: Mirbelia
- Species: M. aotoides

Binomial name
- Mirbelia aotoides F.Muell.

= Mirbelia aotoides =

Species of legume

Mirbelia aotoides is a species of flowering plant in the family Fabaceae and is endemic to Queensland. It is a softly-hairy shrub with narrowly linear leaves with their edges rolled under, and yellow flowers arranged singly or in small groups in leaf axils. It was first formally described in 1859 by Ferdinand von Mueller in Transactions of the Philosophical Institute of Victoria.

This mirbelia occurs in eastern Queensland and is listed as "least concern" under the Queensland Government Nature Conservation Act 1992.
