= Mirbelia ferricola =

Scientific classification
- Kingdom: Plantae
- Clade: Embryophytes
- Clade: Tracheophytes
- Clade: Spermatophytes
- Clade: Angiosperms
- Clade: Eudicots
- Clade: Rosids
- Order: Fabales
- Family: Fabaceae
- Subfamily: Faboideae
- Genus: Mirbelia
- Species: M. ferricola

Binomial name
- Mirbelia ferricola Butcher

Species of legume

Mirbelia ferricola is a species of flowering plant in the family Fabaceae and is endemic to inland parts of the south-west of Western Australia. It is an erect shrub with leaves reduced to small scales, and red and yellow flowers arranged in racemes at the ends of the branches.

== Description ==
Mirbelia ferricola is an erect shrub that typically grows to 1–3 metres high and 0.7–2 m wide. Its leaves are arranged alternately along the stems but are reduced to egg-shaped to triangular scales 1.0–3.5 mm long, 0.6–1.7 mm wide and silky hairy on the upper surface. The flowers are arranged in racemes on the ends of branchlets, each flower on a pedicel 1.4–3.0 mm long with bracts 1.9–3.1 mm long and similar bracteoles 0.8–1.65 mm long, the bracts and bracteoles falling off before the flowers open. The sepals are 4.2–6.1 mm long and joined at the base, the lower three lobes 1.5–3.3 mm long. The standard petal is kidney-shaped with a shallowly notched centre, 8.1–10.3 mm long, 11.8–16.5 mm wide, yellow and red, the wings egg-shaped, 7.6–9.3 mm long and pale yellow with a reddish base, and the keel 5.4–7.1 mm long and creamy yellow with a red tip. Flowering occurs from late June to November and the fruit is an inflated, oval to elliptic pod 6.8–13.5 mm long.

== Taxonomy ==
Mirbelia ferricola was first formally described in 2012 by Ryonen Butcher in the journal Nuytsia from specimens collected in the Helena and Aurora Range in 2008. The specific epithet (ferricola) means "iron-inhabiting", referring to the soil in which this species grows.

== Distribution and habitat ==
This mirbelia grows on rocky lateritic soils in woodland and shrubland in banded iron formations in the Avon Wheatbelt, Coolgardie and Murchison bioregions of south-western, Western Australia.

== Conservation status ==
This mirbelia is listed as "Priority Three" by the Government of Western Australia Department of Biodiversity, Conservation and Attractions, meaning that it is poorly known and known from only a few locations but is not under imminent threat.
