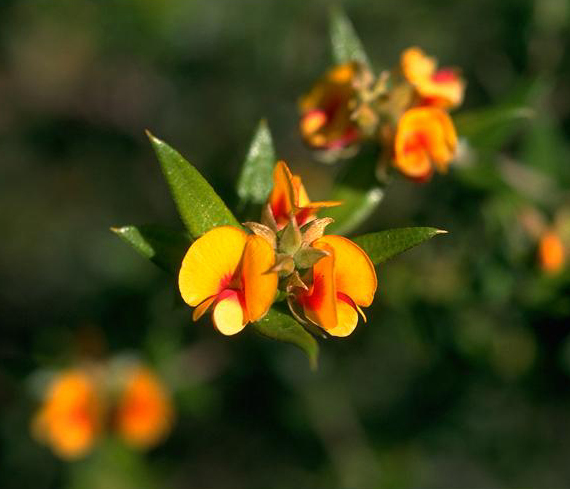
- In the Stirling Range National Park

Scientific classification
- Kingdom: Plantae
- Clade: Tracheophytes
- Clade: Angiosperms
- Clade: Eudicots
- Clade: Rosids
- Order: Fabales
- Family: Fabaceae
- Subfamily: Faboideae
- Genus: Mirbelia
- Species: M. subcordata

Binomial name
- Mirbelia subcordata Turcz.

= Mirbelia subcordata =

Species of legume

Mirbelia subcordata is a species of flowering plant in the family Fabaceae and is endemic to the south-west of Western Australia. It is an erect, spreading shrub with egg-shaped to lance-shaped leaves and yellow or orange and red flowers.

== Description ==
Mirbelia subcordata is an erect, spreading shrub that typically grows to a height of 20–40 cm (7.9–15.7 in) and has many branches. Its leaves are arranged in whorls of three, egg-shaped to lance-shaped, sharply pointed and usually less than 12 mm (0.47 in) long. The flowers are arranged in clusters at the ends of branches or in upper leaf axils, the sepals 5–6 mm (0.20–0.24 in) long. The petals are yellow or orange and red, the standard petal longer than the sepals, the wings and the keel almost as long as the standard. Flowering occurs from September to December and the fruit is a shaggy-hairy, oblong pod.

== Taxonomy ==
Mirbelia subcordata was first formally described in 1853 by Nikolai Turczaninow in the Bulletin de la Société Impériale des Naturalistes de Moscou. The specific epithet (subcordata) means "somewhat heart-shaped", referring to the leaves.

== Distribution and habitat ==
This mirbelia grows on a range of soils on slopes, rises and flats in the Avon Wheatbelt, Esperance Plains and Jarrah Forest bioregions of Western Australia.

== Conservation status ==
Mirbelia subcordata is listed as "not threatened" by the Government of Western Australia Department of Biodiversity, Conservation and Attractions.
