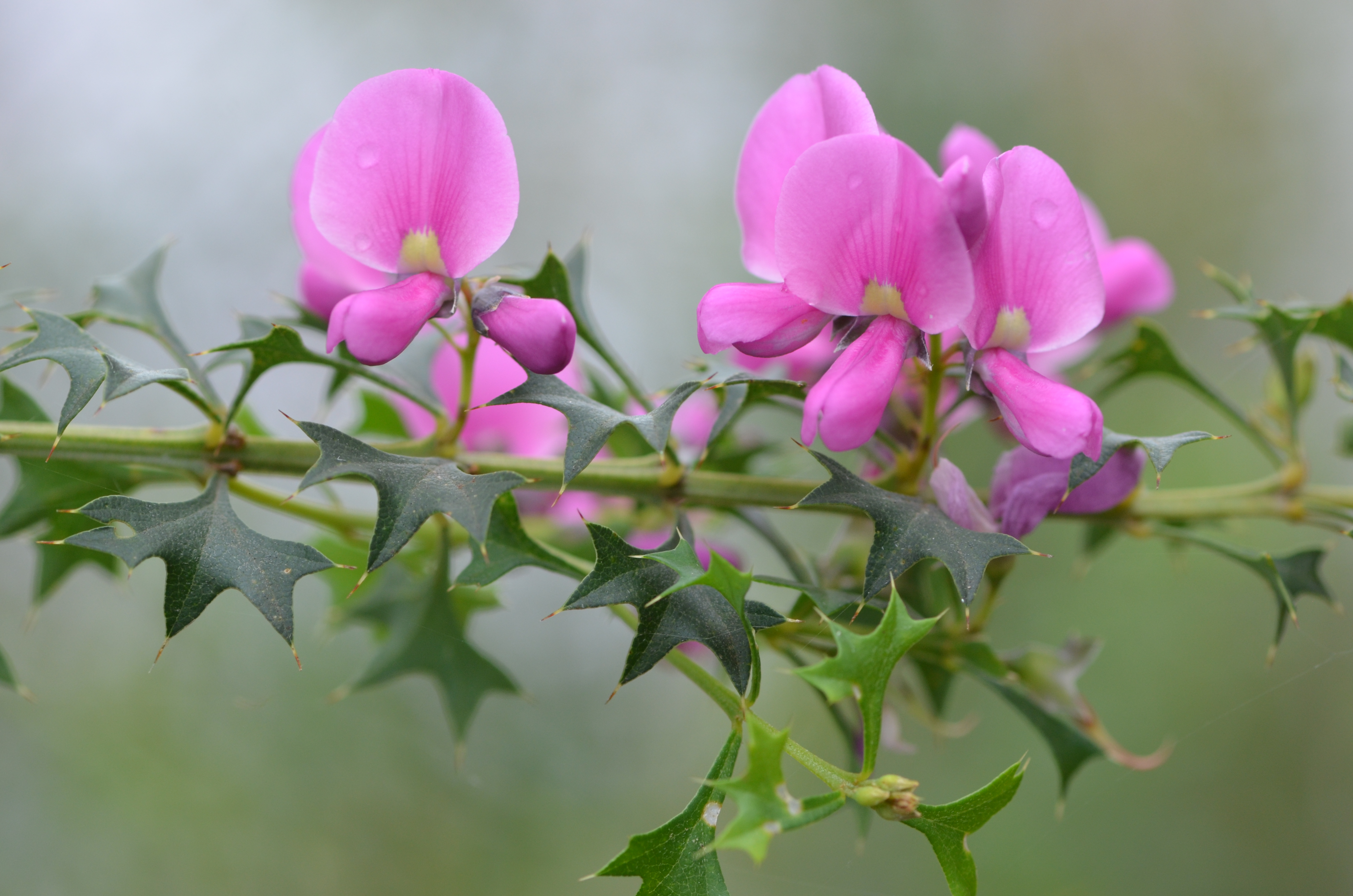
- Near Margaret River

Scientific classification
- Kingdom: Plantae
- Clade: Embryophytes
- Clade: Tracheophytes
- Clade: Angiosperms
- Clade: Eudicots
- Clade: Rosids
- Order: Fabales
- Family: Fabaceae
- Subfamily: Faboideae
- Genus: Mirbelia
- Species: M. dilatata

Binomial name
- Mirbelia dilatata R.Br.

Synonyms
- Mirbelia dilatata R.Br. var. dilatata

= Mirbelia dilatata =

Species of plant

Mirbelia dilatata, commonly known as holly-leaved mirbelia, is a species of flowering plant in the family Fabaceae and is endemic to the south-west of Western Australia. It is an erect, bushy, shrub with prickly leaves and pink, purple or violet flowers.

== Description ==
Mirbelia dilatata is an erect, bushy, sometimes almost weeping shrub that typically grows to a height of 0.5–3 m (1 ft 8 in – 9 ft 10 in). Its leaves are wedge-shaped, 10–35 mm (0.39–1.38 in) long, with three to seven sharply-pointed lobes 3.2–6.5 mm (0.13–0.26 in) long. The leaves are leathery, the base tapered, sometimes to a short petiole. The flowers are arranged singly in leaf axils or in racemes on the ends of branches, on a short pedicel and are about 15 mm (0.59 in) wide. The sepals are 4–5 mm (0.16–0.20 in) long and joined at the base, the lobes about the same length as each other. The petals are pink, bluish-purple or violet, the standard petal twice as long as the sepals and the wings shorter than the standard. Flowering occurs from September to January and the fruit is an oblong pod about 12 mm (0.47 in) long.

== Taxonomy ==
Mirbelia dilatata was first formally described in 1811 by Robert Brown in Hortus Kewensis. The specific epithet (dilatata) means "widened", referring to the leaves widening upwards.

== Distribution and habitat ==
Holly-leaved mirbelia grows in gravelly and sandy soils or laterite in a range of habitats, including forest, woodland and kwongan. It is found in the Avon Wheatbelt, Esperance Plains, Jarrah Forest, Mallee, Swan Coastal Plain and Warren bioregions of south-western Western Australia.

== Conservation status ==
This species of pea is listed as "not threatened" by the Government of Western Australia Department of Biodiversity, Conservation and Attractions.

Mirbelia dilatata

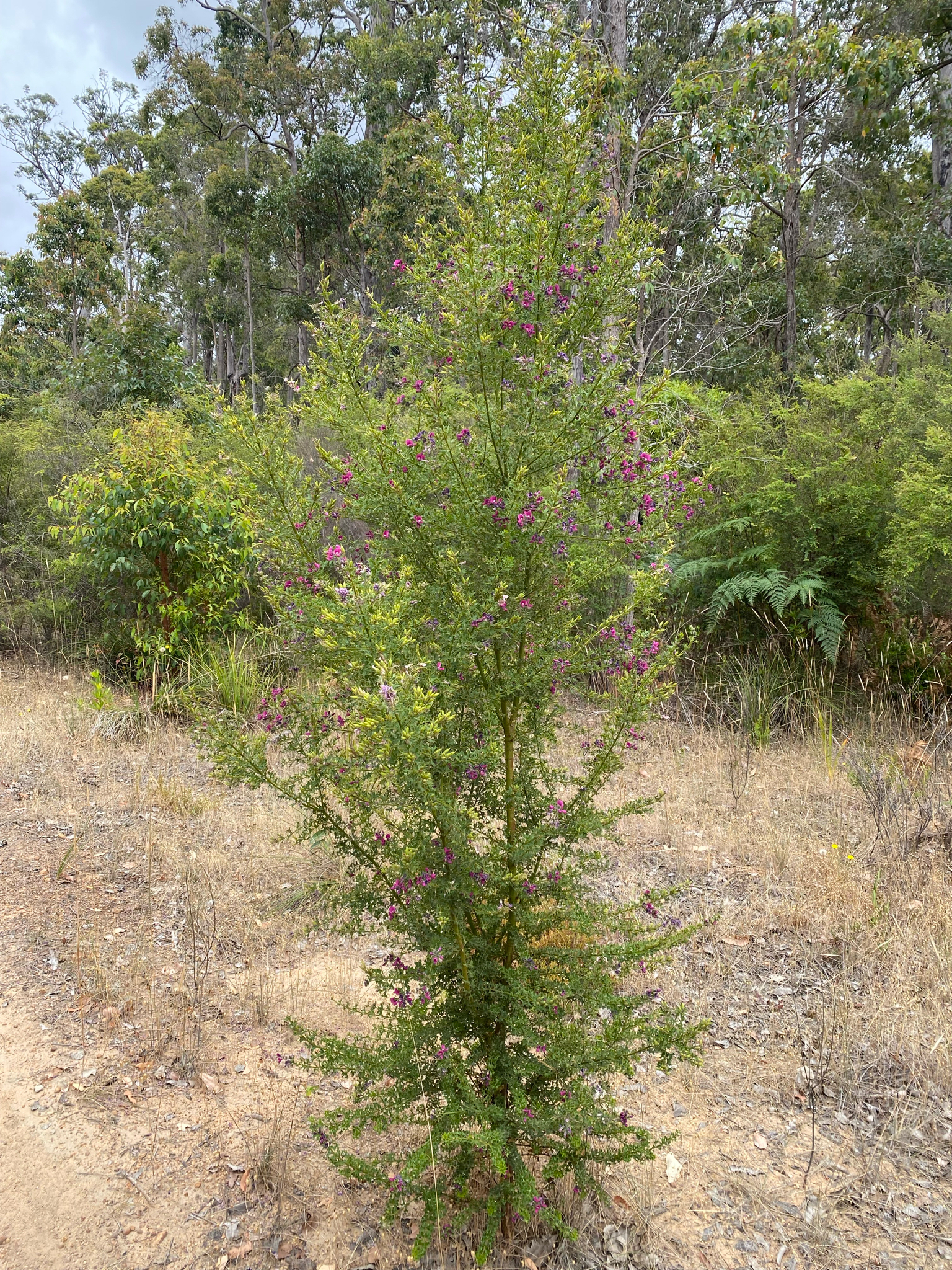
Mirbelia dilatata habit

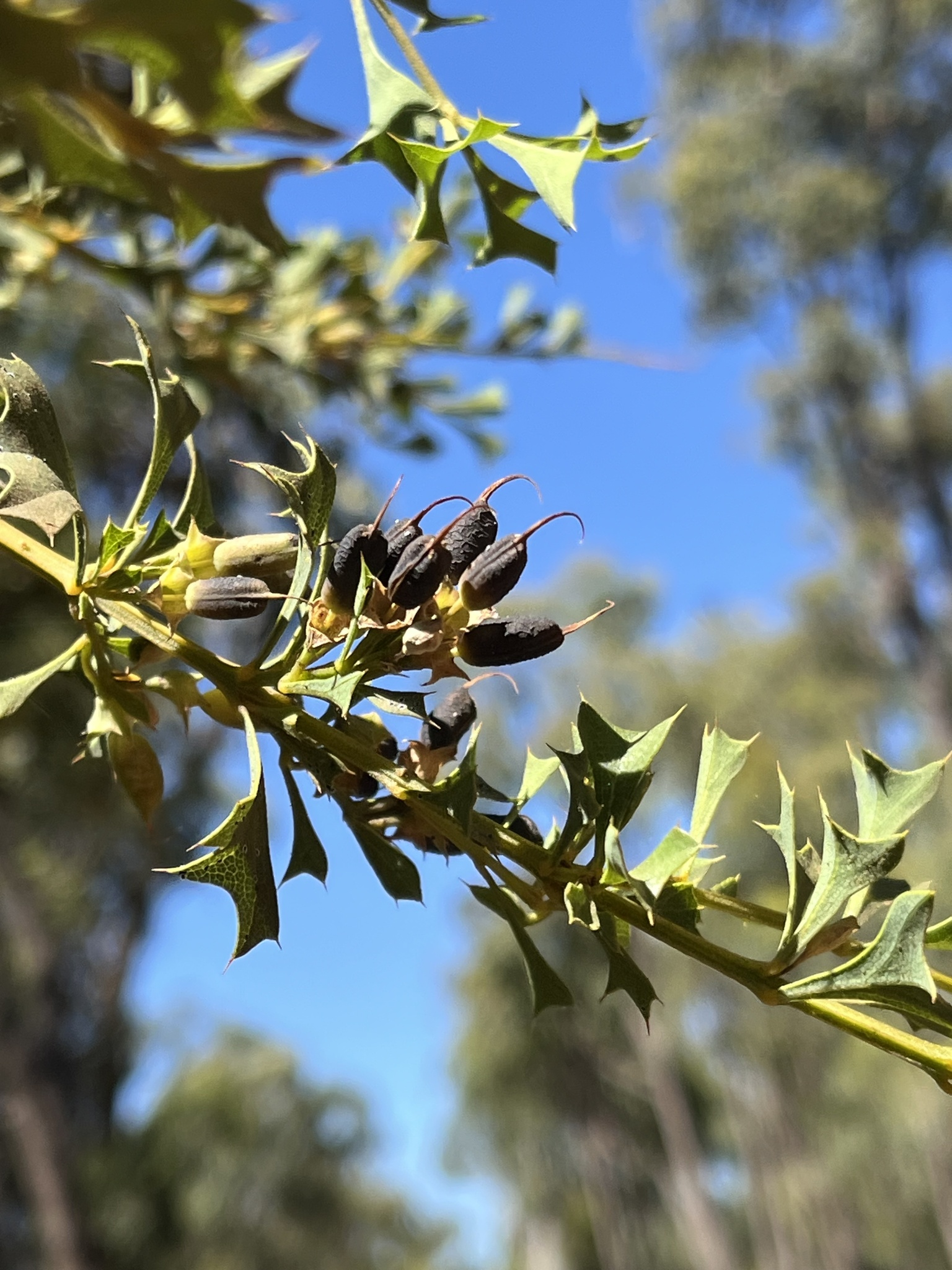
Mirbelia dilatata leaf and fruit

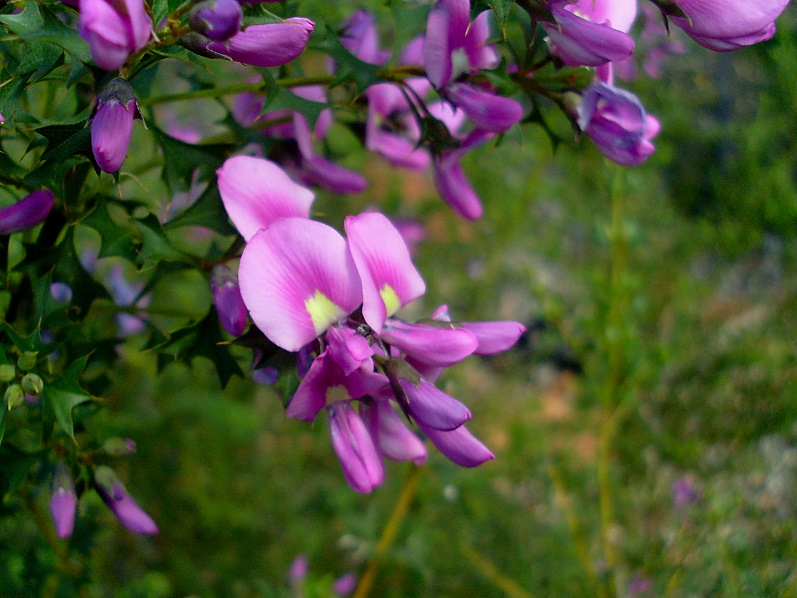
Mirbelia dilatata flowers

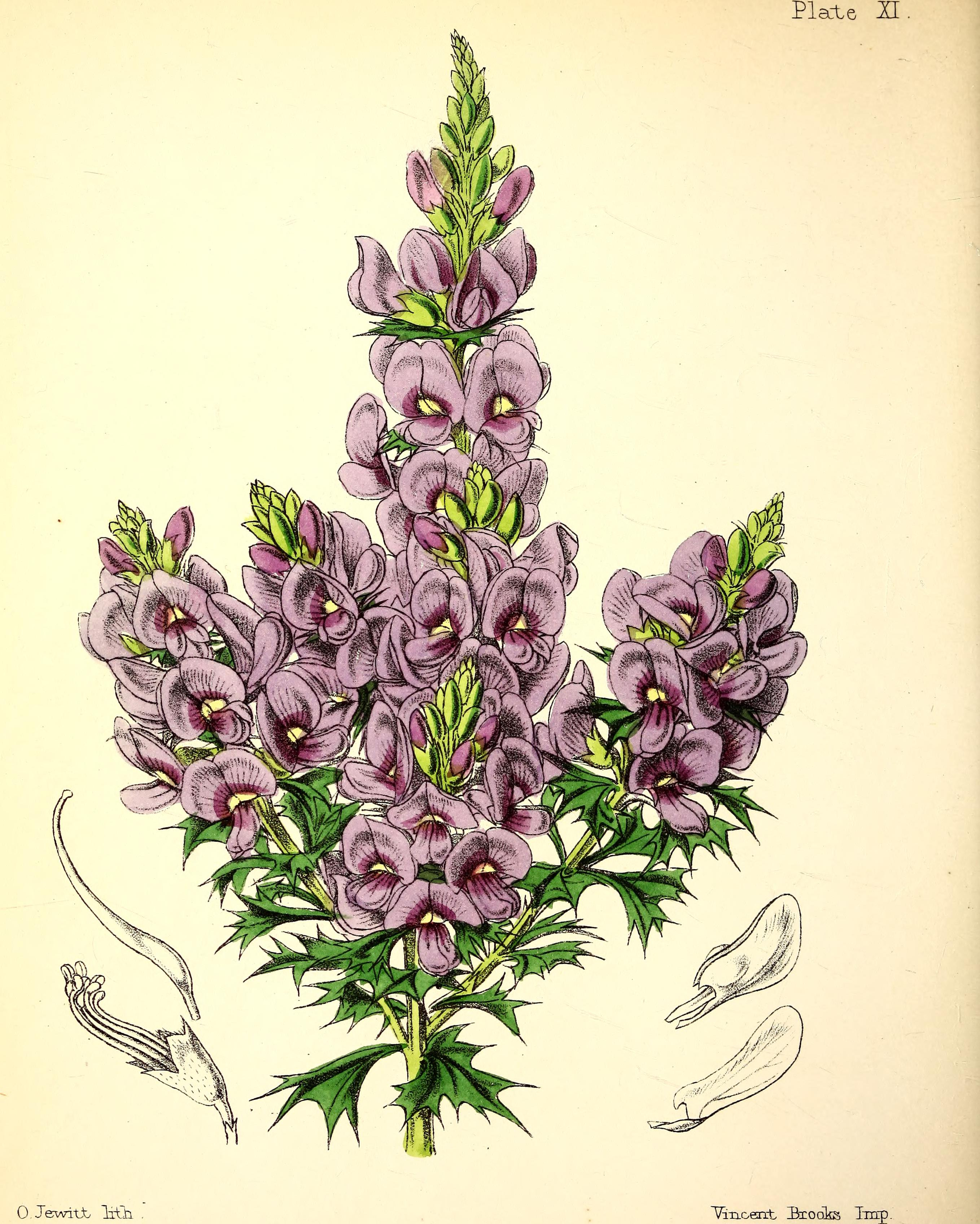
illustration of Mirbelia dilata (1857)
