= Mirbelia stipitata =

Conservation status
- Priority Three — Poorly Known Taxa (DEC)

Scientific classification
- Kingdom: Plantae
- Clade: Tracheophytes
- Clade: Angiosperms
- Clade: Eudicots
- Clade: Rosids
- Order: Fabales
- Family: Fabaceae
- Subfamily: Faboideae
- Genus: Mirbelia
- Species: M. stipitata

Binomial name
- Mirbelia stipitata Crisp & J.M.Taylor

Species of plant

Mirbelia stipitata is a species of flowering plant in the family Fabaceae and is endemic to inland areas of Western Australia. It is a spiny, more or less leafless shrub with yellow and red flowers.

== Description ==
Mirbelia stipitata is a shrub that typically grows to a height of 60 cm (24 in) and is more or less glabrous, its branchlets spiny. Its leaves are reduced to scales less than 1 mm (0.039 in) long. The flowers are arranged singly on the ends of branchlets on a pedicel 2.0–2.75 mm (0.079–0.108 in) long with egg-shaped bracts about 0.75 mm (0.030 in) long, and similar bracteoles that fall off as the flowers open. The sepals are 4–5 mm (0.16–0.20 in) long and joined at the base, the upper two lobes forming a "lip". The standard petal is broadly kidney-shaped, about 6 mm (0.24 in) long and 8 mm (0.31 in) wide, the wings about 5.75 mm (0.226 in) long and the keel 5.25 mm (0.207 in) long. Flowering has been observed in August and the fruit is a stalked, elliptic pod about 6 mm (0.24 in) long.

== Taxonomy ==
Mirbelia stipitata was first formally described in 1987 by Michael Crisp and Joan M. Taylor in the Journal of the Adelaide Botanic Gardens from specimens collected by Paul Graham Wilson near Laverton in 1968. The specific epithet (stipitata) means "stalked", referring to the ovary.

== Distribution ==
This mirbelia is only known from two collections in the Murchison bioregion of inland Western Australia.

== Conservation status ==
Mirbelia stipitata is listed as "Priority Three" by the Government of Western Australia Department of Biodiversity, Conservation and Attractions, meaning that it is poorly known and known from only a few locations but is not under imminent threat.
