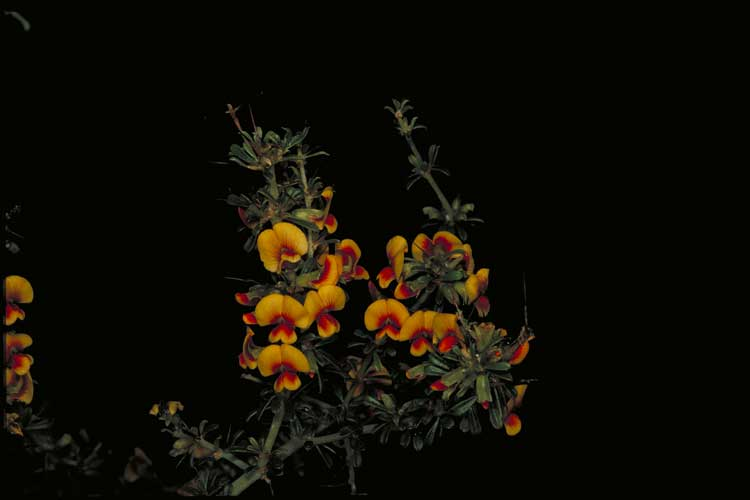
- In the Australian National Botanic Gardens

Scientific classification
- Kingdom: Plantae
- Clade: Tracheophytes
- Clade: Angiosperms
- Clade: Eudicots
- Clade: Rosids
- Order: Fabales
- Family: Fabaceae
- Subfamily: Faboideae
- Genus: Mirbelia
- Species: M. granitica

Binomial name
- Mirbelia granitica Crisp & J.M.Taylor

= Mirbelia granitica =

Species of plant

Mirbelia granitica is a species of flowering plant in the family Fabaceae and is endemic to inland areas of Western Australia. It is an erect or spreading shrub with spiny branches, scattered linear to narrowly egg-shaped leaves and yellow and red flowers.

== Description ==
Mirbelia granitica is an erect or spreading shrub that typically grows to a height of 0.3–1 m (1 ft 0 in – 3 ft 3 in) and has scattered spiny branchlets, the end branchlets short and leafless. Its leaves are scattered, sometimes clustered, linear or narrowly egg-shaped with the narrower end towards the base, 2–6 mm (0.079–0.236 in) long and 0.5–1 mm (0.020–0.039 in) long with the edges turned down or rolled under. The flowers are arranged singly in leaf axils on a pedicel about 1 mm (0.039 in) long with tiny bracts and bracteoles attached. The sepals are 2–3 mm (0.079–0.118 in) long and joined at the base, the upper two lobes forming a notched "lip". The standard petal is broadly egg-shaped with a notched tip, 5.5–7.0 mm (0.22–0.28 in) long, 5.0–7.5 mm (0.20–0.30 in) wide and yellow with dull red markings. The wings are 4.5–5.5 mm (0.18–0.22 in) long and yellow and the keel 3–4 mm (0.12–0.16 in) long and dull red. Flowering occurs from August to December and the fruit is an oval pod about 5 mm (0.20 in) long.

== Taxonomy ==
Mirbelia granitica was first formally described in 1987 by Michael Crisp and Joan M. Taylor in the Journal of the Adelaide Botanic Gardens from specimens collected by Margaret Corrick near the Lake King-Norseman road in 1985. The specific epithet (granitica) means "living on granite soil".

== Distribution and habitat ==
This mirbelia grows heath or low shrubland on granite hills and outcrops in the Avon Wheatbelt, Coolgardie, Mallee and Murchison bioregions of inland Western Australia.

== Conservation status ==
Mirbelia granitica is listed as "not threatened" by the Government of Western Australia Department of Biodiversity, Conservation and Attractions.
