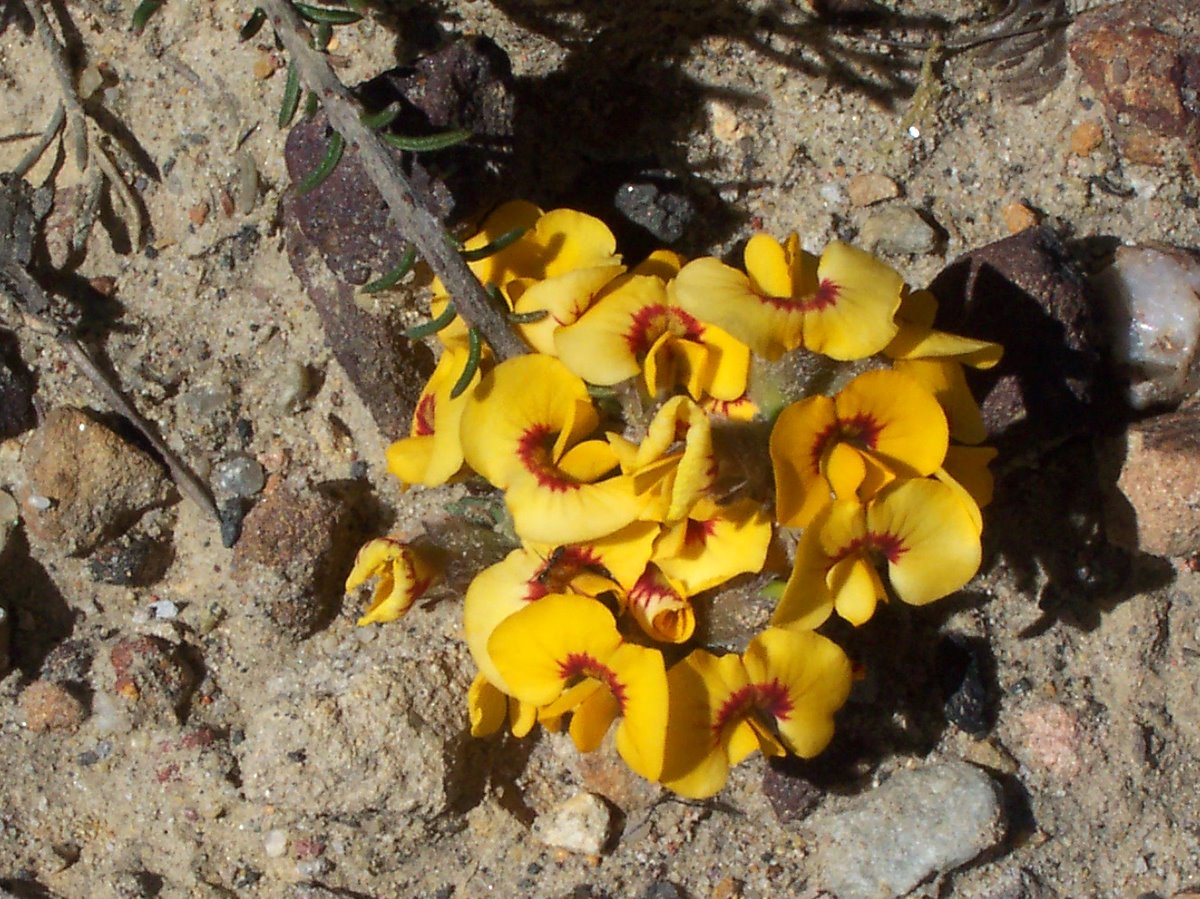
- In Morton National Park

Scientific classification
- Kingdom: Plantae
- Clade: Tracheophytes
- Clade: Angiosperms
- Clade: Eudicots
- Clade: Rosids
- Order: Fabales
- Family: Fabaceae
- Subfamily: Faboideae
- Genus: Mirbelia
- Species: M. baueri

Binomial name
- Mirbelia baueri (Benth.) Joy Thomps.

Synonyms
- Chorizema baueri Benth.; Chorozema baueri Benth. orth. var.; Mirbelia jeanae Blakely

= Mirbelia baueri =

Species of legume

Mirbelia baueri is a species of flowering plant in the family Fabaceae and is endemic to New South Wales. It is an erect or prostrate shrub with sharply-pointed linear leaves and orange and purple flowers.

== Description ==
Mirbelia baueri is an erect or prostrate, sometimes mat-forming shrub that typically grows to a height of 30–50 cm (12–20 in) and has softly-hairy stems. Its leaves are linear, 5–15 mm (0.20–0.59 in) long, about 1 mm (0.039 in) wide and sharply-pointed with the edges rolled under. The flowers are arranged singly in leaf axils, each flower on a short pedicel. The sepals are softly-hairy, 5–6 mm (0.20–0.24 in) long and joined at the base, the lobes shorter than the sepal tube. The petals are 8–15 mm (0.31–0.59 in) long, orange or yellow and purple. Flowering occurs in October and November, and the fruit is an oval pod about 6 mm (0.24 in) long with a pointed end.

== Taxonomy ==
This pea was first formally described in 1837 by George Bentham, who gave it the name Chorizema baueri in Commentationes de Leguminosarum Generibus, based on specimens collected by Ferdinand Bauer. In 1958, Joy Thompson changed the name to Mirbelia baueri in the Proceedings of the Linnean Society of New South Wales.

In 1938, William Blakely described Mirbelia jeanae and wrote "Named in honour of Miss Jean Buckingham, junior member of the Australian Naturalists' Society of New South Wales, who discovered this very pretty species on a rocky sandstone plateau in Gold Gully, 2 miles south-east of Penrose railway station, October 2, 1938". Ronald Melville advised Joy Thompson that M. jeanae "appeared to be synonymous with M. baueri, and it is listed as such by the Australian Plant Census.

== Distribution and habitat ==
Mirbelia baueri grows at higher altitude in exposed heathlands in rocky areas on sandy soils. It mainly occurs from the Blue Mountains to Nerriga, but is also found on the South and Central coasts.
