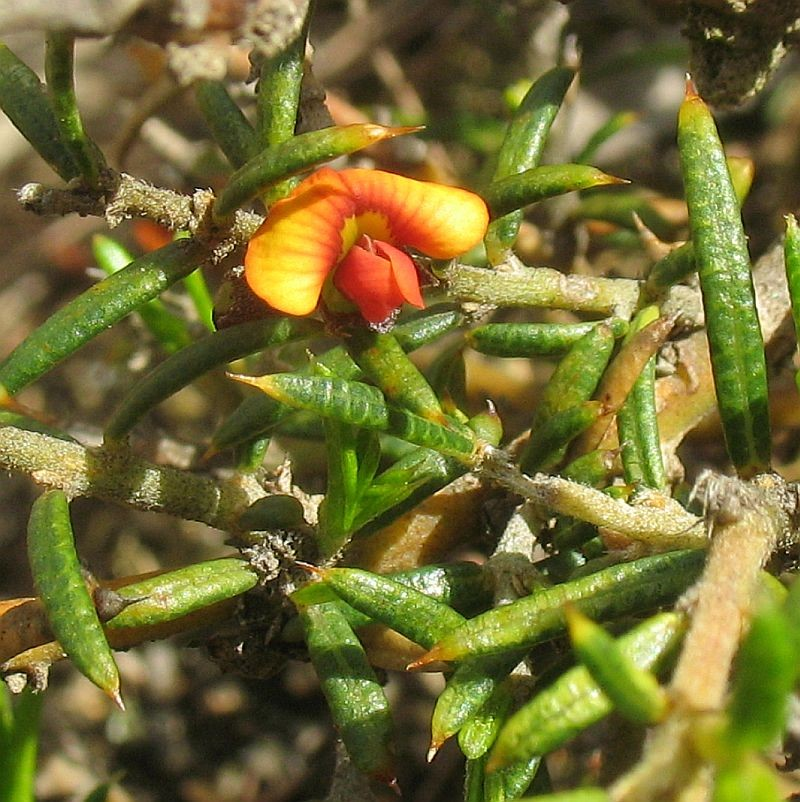
- Near Bemboka

Scientific classification
- Kingdom: Plantae
- Clade: Tracheophytes
- Clade: Angiosperms
- Clade: Eudicots
- Clade: Rosids
- Order: Fabales
- Family: Fabaceae
- Subfamily: Faboideae
- Genus: Mirbelia
- Species: M. pungens

Binomial name
- Mirbelia pungens A.Cunn. ex G.Don

= Mirbelia pungens =

Species of legume

Mirbelia pungens, commonly known as prickly mirbelia, is a species of flowering plant in the family Fabaceae and is endemic to south-eastern continental Australia. It is an erect or prostrate shrub with sharply-pointed linear leaves and orange-red flowers with blue or purple markings.

== Description ==
Mirbelia pungens is an erect or prostrate shrub that typically grows to a height of 0.3–0.5 m (1 ft 0 in – 1 ft 8 in), and has softly-hairy stems. Its leaves are linear and sharply pointed, mostly 8–15 mm (0.31–0.59 in) long, about 1 mm (0.039 in) wide on a petiole up to 0.5 mm (0.020 in) long. The flowers are arranged singly or in groups of up to four in leaf axils on a peduncle up to about 1 mm (0.039 in) long. The sepals are 2.5–4.0 mm (0.098–0.157 in) long, softly-hairy and joined at the base, the lobes shorter than the sepal tube. The standard petal is orange-red with blue or purple markings, the keel purplish and nearly as long as the wings. Flowering occurs from September to November and the fruit is an oval pod about 3 mm (0.12 in) long.

== Taxonomy ==
Mirbelia pungens was first formally described in 1832 by George Don in A General History of Dichlamydeous Plants from an unpublished manuscript by Allan Cunningham. The specific epithet (pungens) means "ending in a sharp, hard point".

== Distribution and habitat ==
This mirbelia grows in stony areas in heath and is widespread in south-eastern Queensland, New South Wales, the Australian Capital Territory and in the far north-east of Victoria.

== Conservation status ==
Mirbelia pungens is listed as "vulnerable in Victoria" on the Victorian Department of Sustainability and Environment's Advisory List of Rare Or Threatened Plants In Victoria.
