= Charles Gardner (botanist) =

Botanist from Western Australia (1896–1970)

- Born: Charles Austin Gardner; 6 January 1896; Lancaster, Lancashire, England, United Kingdom
- Died: 24 February 1970 (aged 74); Subiaco, Western Australia, Australia
- Occupation: Botanist
- Scientific career
- Author abbrev. (botany): C.A.Gardner

Charles Austin Gardner (6 January 1896 – 24 February 1970) was a Western Australian botanist.

== Biography ==
Born in Lancaster, in England, on 6 January 1896, Gardner emigrated to Western Australia with his family in 1909, where they took possession of land at Yorkrakine.

Gardner showed an interest in art and botany from youth, becoming engrossed in his state museum's copy of Bentham's Flora Australiensis (London, 1863–78) and received encouragement from the government's botanist Desmond Herbert and botanical artist Emily Pelloe. After a BSc in biology, he was appointed a botanical collector for the Forests Department in 1920, and the following year was engaged as botanist on the Kimberley Exploration Expedition, resulting in his first publication, Botanical Notes, Kimberley Division of Western Australia, which gave descriptions for twenty new species. In 1924 he transferred to the Department of Agriculture, and following a departmental re-organisation in 1928 he was appointed Government Botanist and Curator of the State Herbarium.

During this time he also wrote on botanical topics in governmental and public Western Australian media, including the remote students educational publication Our Rural Magazine. His 'Wildflowers of Western Australia, published by The West Australian in the 1940s went to over twenty editions.

== Travels and publications ==
He travelled widely and published around 320 papers, the most important of which were Contributions to the Flora of Western Australia in Journal of the Royal Society of Western Australia (from 1923), Enumeratio Plantarum Australiae Occidentalis (1930), a census of the state's plants, and Flora of Western Australia Volume 1, Part 1, Gramineae (1952). He described eight genera and around 200 new species. In 1937 he became the first Australian Botanical Liaison Officer at the Royal Botanic Gardens, Kew.

His published works and contributions include,

- (with H.W. Bennetts), (1956) The Toxic Plants of Western Australia, Perth, West Australian Newspapers.
- Lane-Poole, C. E, A primer of forestry, with illustrations of the principal forest trees of Western Australia. 1922.

== Legacy ==
Gardner was awarded the Medal of the Royal Society of Western Australia in 1949, and the Clarke Medal of the Royal Society of New South Wales in 1961.

He retired in 1962, and died from diabetes at Subiaco, Western Australia, on 24 February 1970, aged 74. His personal botanical collection was bequeathed to the Benedictine Community at New Norcia, but was transferred to the State Herbarium in Perth in June 1970.

== See also ==
- Category:Taxa named by Charles Gardner (botanist)

Awards
Preceded by Austin Burton Edwards	Clarke Medal; 1961	Succeeded by Horace Waring
