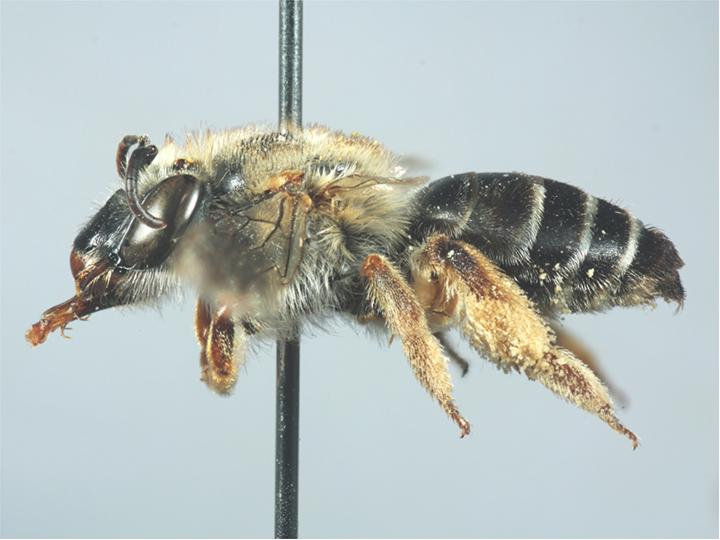
- Female

Scientific classification
- Kingdom: Animalia
- Phylum: Arthropoda
- Clade: Pancrustacea
- Class: Insecta
- Order: Hymenoptera
- Family: Colletidae
- Genus: Trichocolletes
- Species: T. leucogenys

Binomial name
- Trichocolletes leucogenys Batley & Houston, 2012

= Trichocolletes leucogenys =

Species of bee

Trichocolletes leucogenys is a species of bee in the family Colletidae and the subfamily Colletinae. It is endemic to Australia. It was described in 2012 by Australian entomologists Michael Batley and Terry Houston.

== Etymology ==
The specific epithet leucogenys (Greek: 'white cheeks') refers to the dense, white, facial hair of the male.

== Description ==
The body length is about 12–13 mm. The eyes are hairy. Colouration is mainly black and brown, with narrow silver metasomal bands, and with orange and white hair.

== Distribution and habitat ==
The species occurs in south-western Australia. The type locality is Dryandra State Forest, 27 km north-west of Narrogin.

== Behaviour ==
The adults are flying mellivores. Flowering plants visited by the bees include Chorizema racemosum, Daviesia aphylla, Daviesia brevifolia, Daviesia costata, Daviesia decurrens, Gastrolobium parviflorum and Jacksonia compressa.

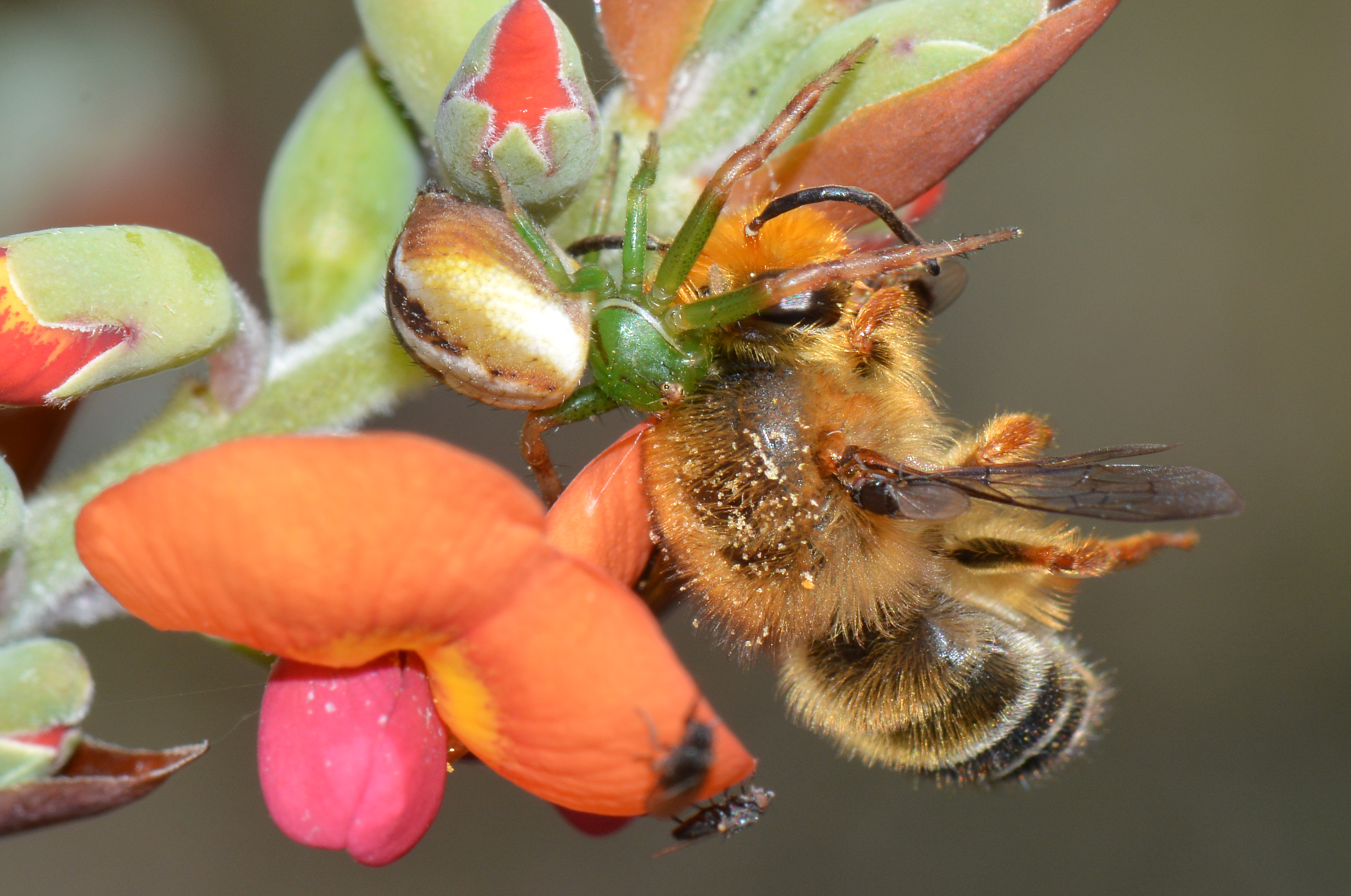
Trichocolletes leucogenys bee caught by a crab spider

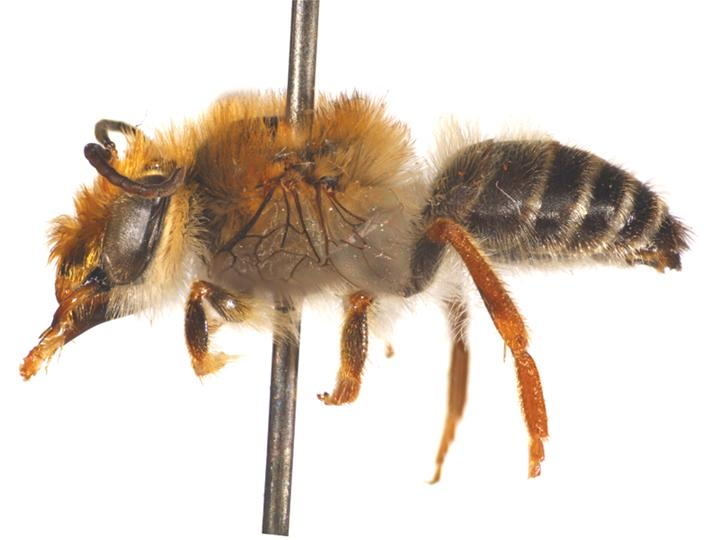
Male
