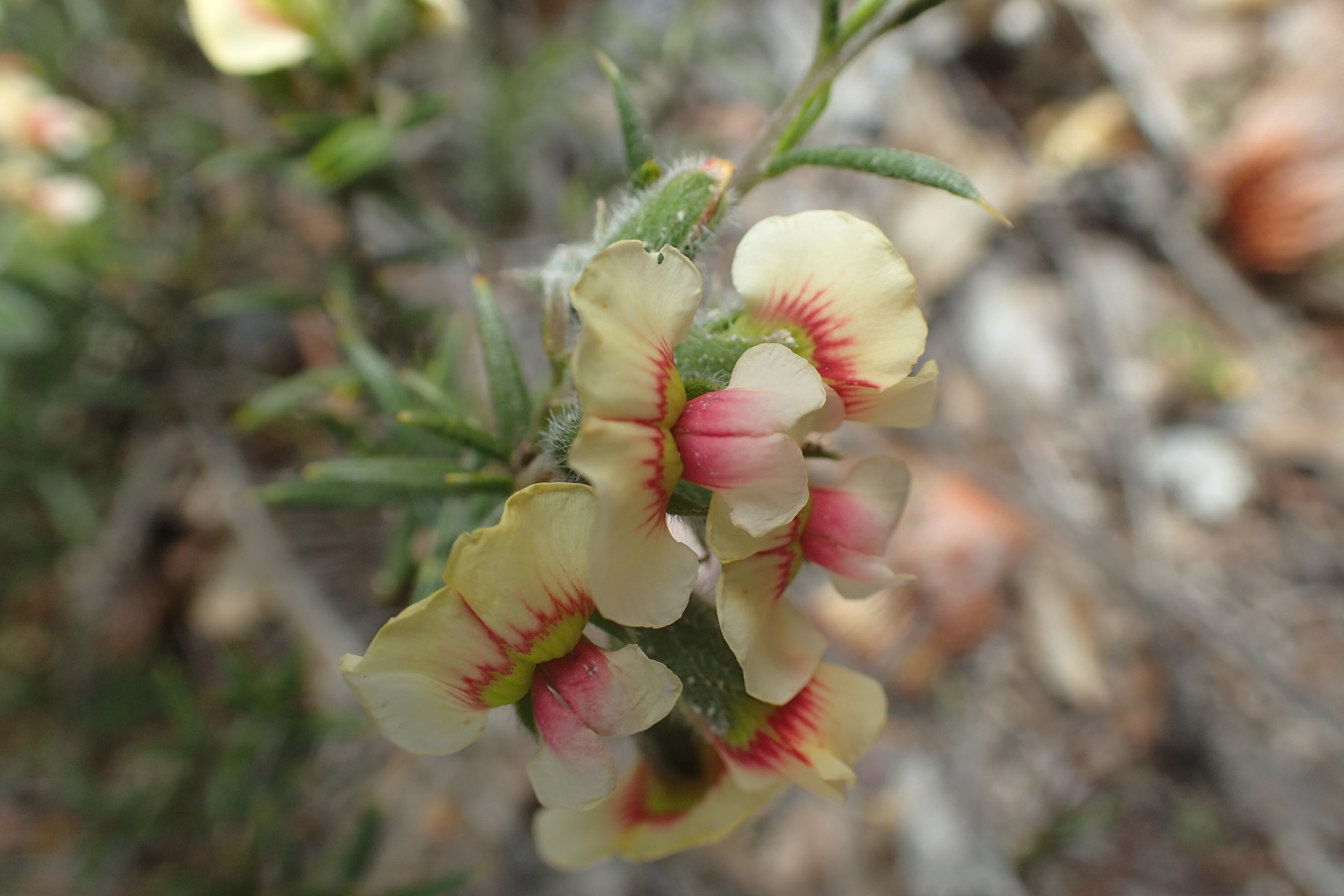
- Subspecies laxum

Scientific classification
- Kingdom: Plantae
- Clade: Tracheophytes
- Clade: Angiosperms
- Clade: Eudicots
- Clade: Rosids
- Order: Fabales
- Family: Fabaceae
- Subfamily: Faboideae
- Genus: Chorizema
- Species: C. aciculare

Binomial name
- Chorizema aciculare (DC.) C.A.Gardner

Synonyms
- Chorizema aciculoides A.D.Chapm. orth. var.; Orthotropis pungens Lindl.; Podolobium aciculare DC.

= Chorizema aciculare =

Species of legume

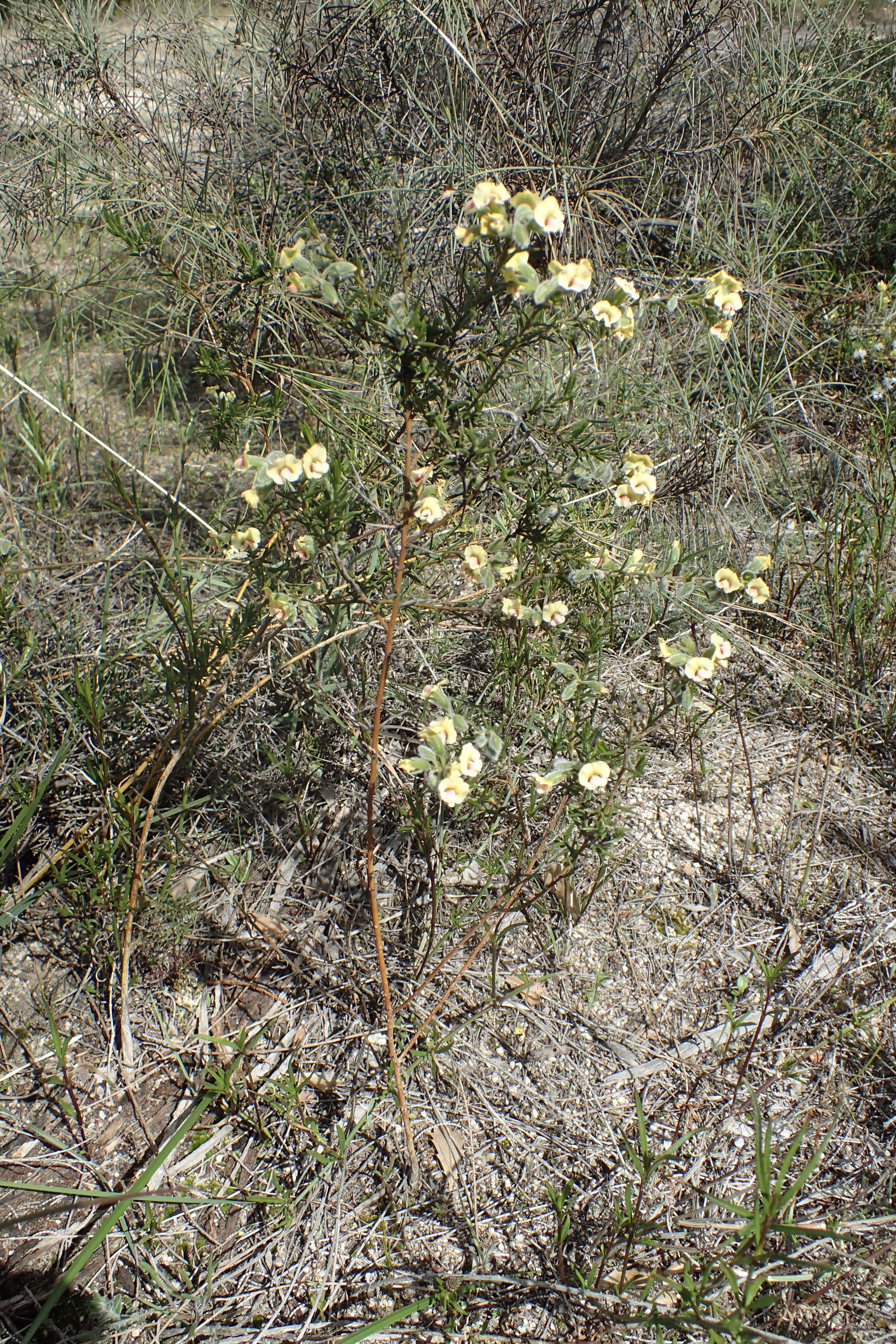
Habit in the Wallaby Hills Nature Reserve near York

Chorizema aciculare, commonly known as needle-leaved chorizema, is a species of flowering plant in the family Fabaceae and is endemic to the southwest of Western Australia. It is a shrub with sharply-pointed leaves, the flower colour depending on subspecies.

== Description ==
Chorizema aciculare is an erect or spreading shrub that typically grows to a height of 0.15–1.0 m (5.9 in – 3 ft 3.4 in). The leaves are 8–28 mm (0.31–1.10 in) long with the edges rolled under, obscuring the lower surface in the case of subspecies aciculare. The flowers of subspecies aciculare are pink or orange, those of subsp. laxum usually pale yellow or orange.

== Taxonomy ==
Needle-leaved chorizema was first formally described in 1825 by Augustin Pyramus de Candolle who gave it the name Podolobium aciculare in Annales des Sciences Naturelles. In 1930, Charles Gardner changed the name to Chorizema aciculare in his Enumeratio Plantarum Australiae Occidentalis. The specific epithet (aciculare) means "needle-pointed", referring to the leaves.

In 1992, Joan M. Taylor and Michael Crisp described two subspecies of C. aciculare in Australian Systematic Botany, and the names are accepted by the Australian Plant Census:

- Chorizema aciculare (DC.) C.A.Gardner subsp. aciculare;
- Chorizema aciculare subsp. laxum J.M.Taylor & Crisp.

== Distribution and habitat ==
Chorizema aciculare mostly grows in woodland or coastal kwongan on granite outcrops, undulating plains, ridges or on coastal dunes and is widespread from near Geraldton to Israelite Bay in the south-west of Western Australia.
