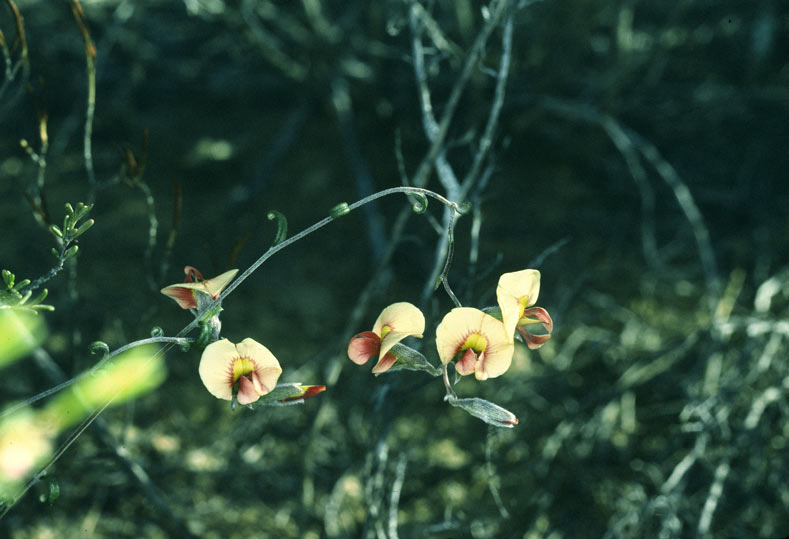
- Near Grass Patch, Western Australia

Conservation status
- Priority Three — Poorly Known Taxa (DEC)

Scientific classification
- Kingdom: Plantae
- Clade: Tracheophytes
- Clade: Angiosperms
- Clade: Eudicots
- Clade: Rosids
- Order: Fabales
- Family: Fabaceae
- Subfamily: Faboideae
- Genus: Chorizema
- Species: C. circinale

Binomial name
- Chorizema circinale J.M.Taylor & Crisp

= Chorizema circinale =

Species of legume

Chorizema circinale is a species of flowering plant in the family Fabaceae and is endemic to the southwest of Western Australia. It is a prostrate, scrambling, wiry shrub that typically grows to a height of up to 40 cm (16 in) and has yellow, orange and red flowers. It was first formally described in 1992 Joan Taylor and Michael Crisp in Australian Systematic Botany, from specimens collected about 53 km (33 mi) west of Grass Patch in 1983. The specific epithet (circinale) means "curved or bent like a crozier", referring to the leaves.

This chorizema grows in sand and sandy clay with gravel on flats in the Coolgardie, Esperance Plains and Mallee bioregions of south-western Western Australia.

Chorizema circinale is listed as "Priority Three" by the Western Australian Government Department of Biodiversity, Conservation and Attractions.
