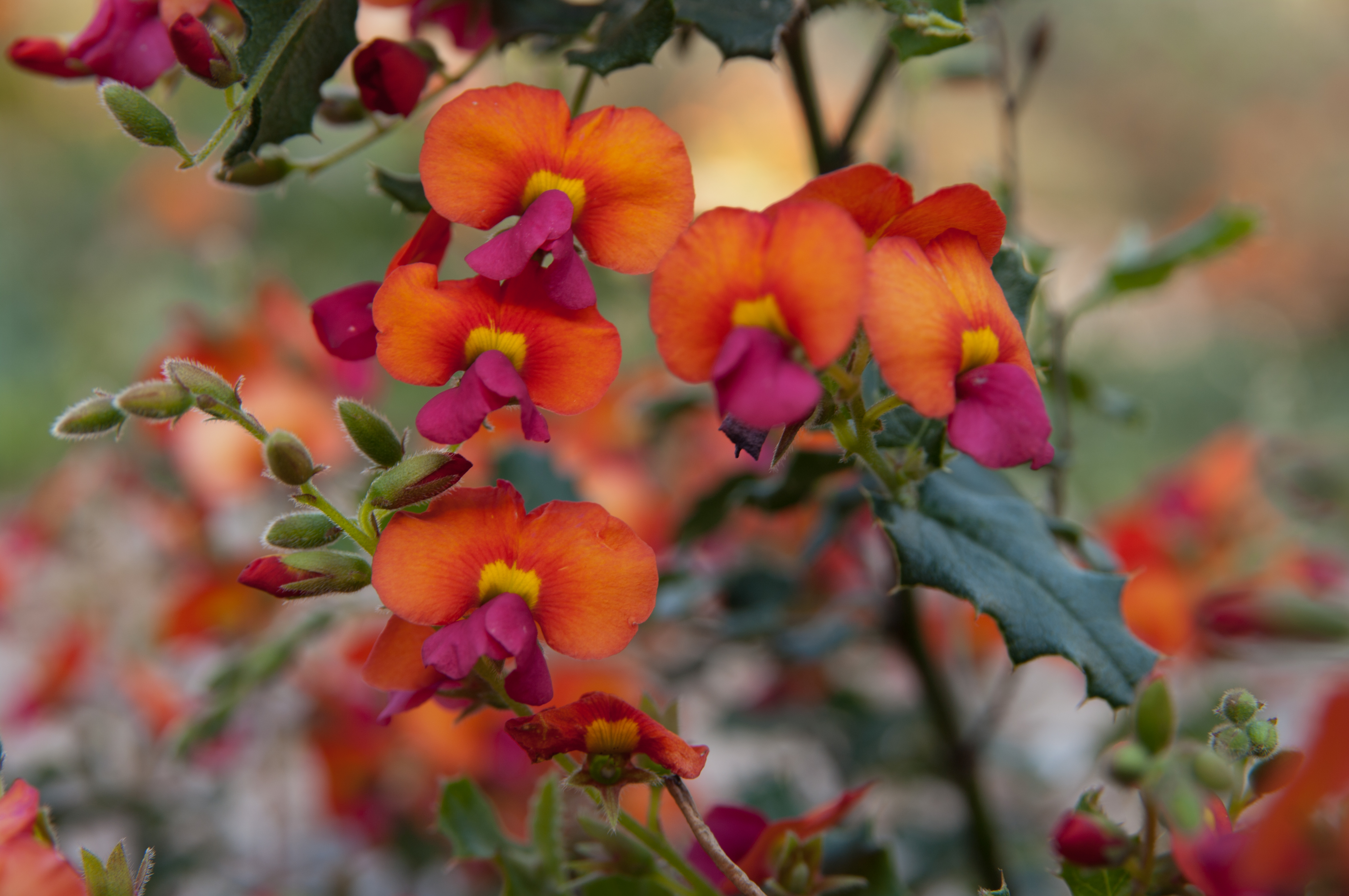

Conservation status
- Declared rare (DEC)

Scientific classification
- Kingdom: Plantae
- Clade: Tracheophytes
- Clade: Angiosperms
- Clade: Eudicots
- Clade: Rosids
- Order: Fabales
- Family: Fabaceae
- Subfamily: Faboideae
- Genus: Chorizema
- Species: C. varium

Binomial name
- Chorizema varium Paxton

Synonyms
- Chorisema varium Heynh. orth. var.; Chorizema elegans A.Vilm. nom. inval., pro syn.; Chorizema varia Paxton orth. var.; Chorizema varium Benth. ex Lindl. nom. illeg., nom. superfl.; Chorizema varium Paxton var. varium; Chorozema varium Lindl. orth. var.

= Chorizema varium =

Species of legume

Chorizema varium, commonly known as bush flame pea, is a species of flowering plant in the family Fabaceae, and is endemic to the south-west of Western Australia. It is a spreading shrub with prickly, heart-shaped leaves and orange, yellow and pinkish-red flowers.

== Description ==
Chorizema varium is a prostrate, spreading or scrambling shrub that typically grows to a height of about 30 cm (12 in) and has softly-hairy branches. Its leaves are heart-shaped, 15–45 mm (0.59–1.77 in) long, 8–27 mm (0.31–1.06 in) wide and wavy with more or less prickly teeth on the edges. The flowers are arranged in racemes, each flower on a pedicel 3–4 mm (0.12–0.16 in) long. The sepals are hairy and 6.0–7.5 mm (0.24–0.30 in) long. The flowers are orange, yellow and pinkish-red, the standard petal 9–14 mm (0.35–0.55 in) long, the wings 9.0–10.5 mm (0.35–0.41 in) long, and the keel 5–6 mm (0.20–0.24 in) long. Flowering mainly occurs from September to October and the fruit is a pod 13–17 mm (0.51–0.67 in) long.

== Taxonomy ==
Chorizema varium was first formally described in 1839 by Joseph Paxton in his "Magazine of Botany". The specific epithet (varium) means "variable", referring to the leaves.

== Distribution and habitat ==
This species of pea grows on coastal limestone hills and outcrops in the Swan Coastal Plain bioregion of south-western Western Australia.

== Conservation status ==
Chorizema varium is listed as "Threatened" by the Western Australian Government Department of Biodiversity, Conservation and Attractions, meaning that it is in danger of extinction.
