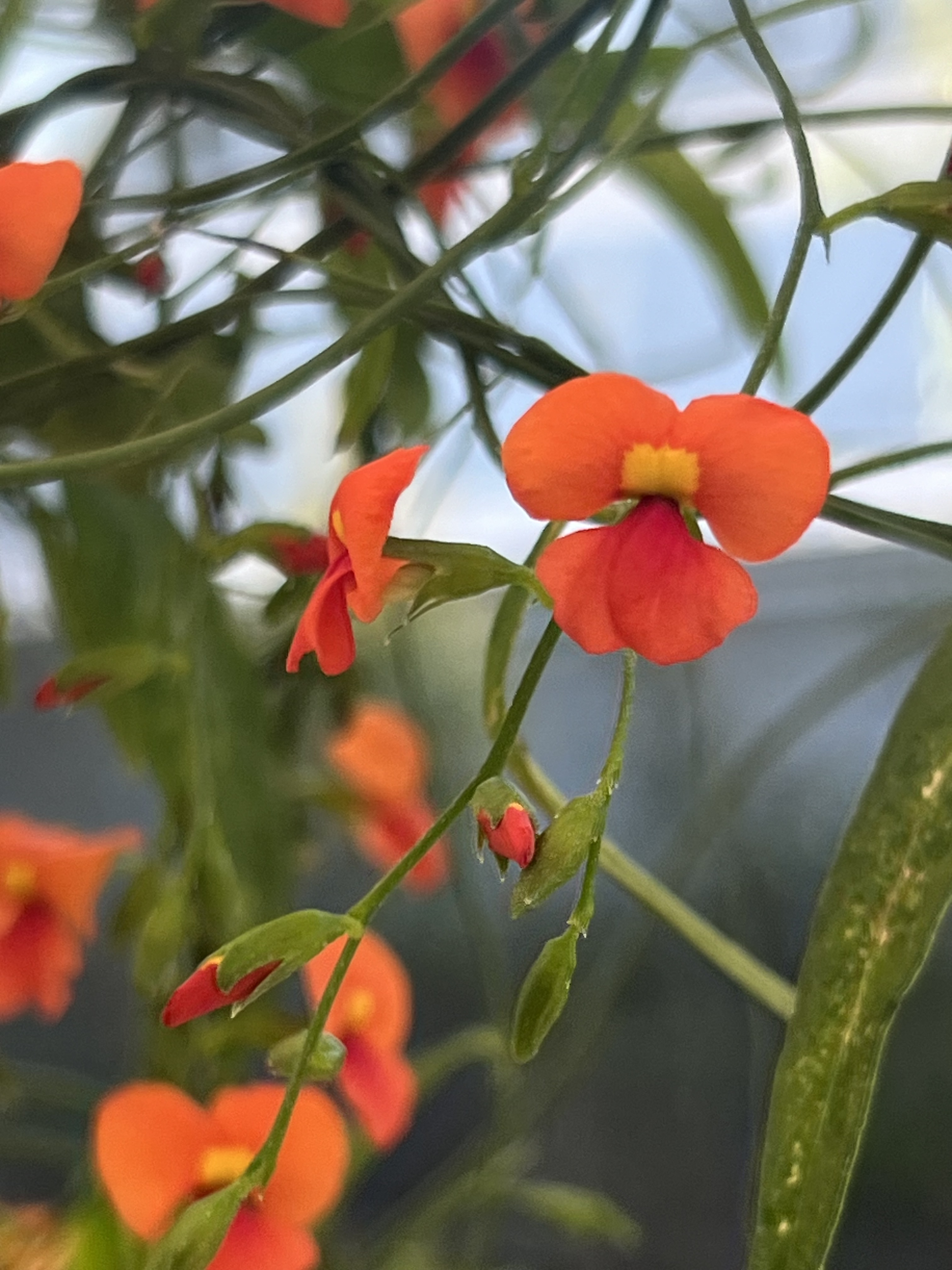

Scientific classification
- Kingdom: Plantae
- Clade: Tracheophytes
- Clade: Angiosperms
- Clade: Eudicots
- Clade: Rosids
- Order: Fabales
- Family: Fabaceae
- Subfamily: Faboideae
- Genus: Chorizema
- Species: C. diversifolium

Binomial name
- Chorizema diversifolium A.DC.

= Chorizema diversifolium =

Species of legume

Chorizema diversifolium is a species of flowering plant in the family Fabaceae and is endemic to the southwest of Western Australia. It is a twining or trailing shrub or climber with variably-shaped, egg-shaped to narrowly lance-shaped leaves and pink, orange and red flowers.

== Description ==
Chorizema diversifolium is a twining or trailing shrub or climber with weak, slender branches. Its leaves are variably-shaped, egg-shaped to narrowly lance shaped, 25–50 mm (0.98–1.97 in) long and glabrous or softly-hairy on the lower surface. The flowers are arranged in loose racemes, the sepals silky-hairy, about 8 mm (0.31 in) long, the upper two lobes curved and joined for about half their length. The petals are pink, orange and red, the standard petal half as long again as the sepals, the keel about the same length as the sepals. Flowering occurs from August to December.

== Taxonomy ==
Chorizema diversifolium was first formally described in 1839 by Alphonse Pyramus de Candolle in Rapport sur les plantes rares ou nouvelles qui ont fleuri dans le Jardin de Botanique de Genève from specimens provided by M. Grenier, without him being able to describe where it came from. The specific epithet (diversifolium) means "different-leaved", referring to the species' variable leaf forms.

== Distribution and habitat ==
This flame pea grows on limestone or granite outcrops in the Esperance Plains, Jarrah Forest, Swan Coastal Plain and Warren bioregions of south-western Western Australia.
