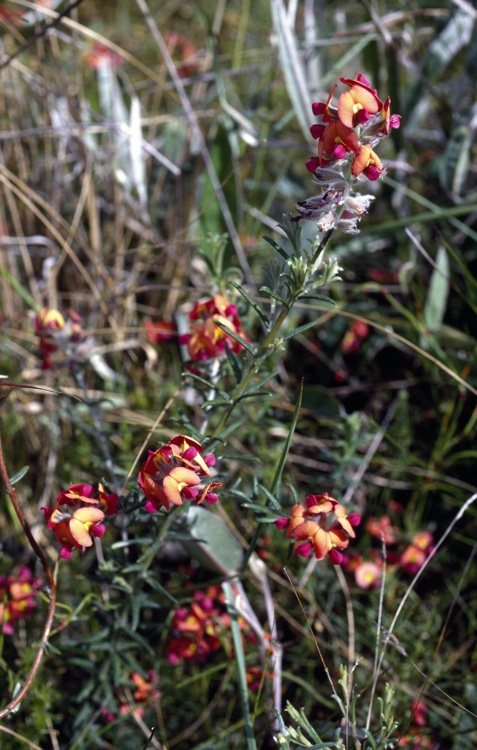
- Near Wellstead

Scientific classification
- Kingdom: Plantae
- Clade: Tracheophytes
- Clade: Angiosperms
- Clade: Eudicots
- Clade: Rosids
- Order: Fabales
- Family: Fabaceae
- Subfamily: Faboideae
- Genus: Chorizema
- Species: C. cytisoides

Binomial name
- Chorizema cytisoides Turcz.

= Chorizema cytisoides =

Species of legume

Chorizema cytisoides is a species of flowering plant in the family Fabaceae and is endemic to the southwest of Western Australia. It is an erect to low-lying or sprawling shrub with linear leaves and reddish-orange, yellow and purple flowers.

== Description ==
Chorizema cytisoides is an erect to low-lying or sprawling shrub that typically grows to a height of 15–45 cm (5.9–17.7 in). Its leaves are linear, 13–19 mm (0.51–0.75 in) long with the edges rolled under and silky-hairy on the lower surface. The flowers are arranged in spike-like racemes up to 25–38 mm (0.98–1.50 in) long on the ends of branches. There are silky-hairy, lance-shaped bracts and bracteoles at the base of the flowers. The flowers are reddish-orange, yellow and purple, the sepals about 8.5 mm (0.33 in) long and silky-hairy, the upper two lobes joined for about half their length. The standard petal is about 13 mm (0.51 in) long, the wings and keel slightly shorter and the keel has an erect point on the end. Flowering occurs from July to December.

== Taxonomy ==
Chorizema cytisoides was first formally described in 1853 by Nikolai Turczaninow in the Bulletin de la Société Impériale des Naturalistes de Moscou. The specific epithet (cytisoides) means "Cytisus-like".

== Distribution and habitat ==
This species of pea grows on plains, slopes and gravelly ridges in the Avon Wheatbelt, Esperance Plains and Jarrah Forest bioregions of south-western Western Australia.
