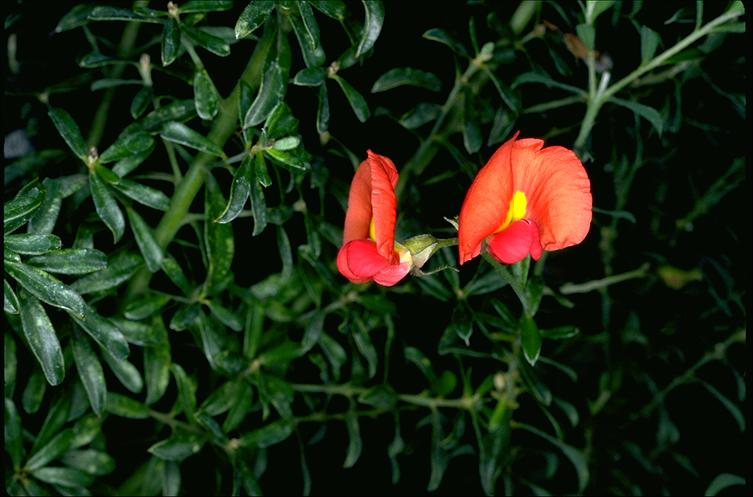
- In the Australian National Botanic Gardens

Scientific classification
- Kingdom: Plantae
- Clade: Tracheophytes
- Clade: Angiosperms
- Clade: Eudicots
- Clade: Rosids
- Order: Fabales
- Family: Fabaceae
- Subfamily: Faboideae
- Genus: Chorizema
- Species: C. dicksonii

Binomial name
- Chorizema dicksonii Graham

= Chorizema dicksonii =

Species of legume

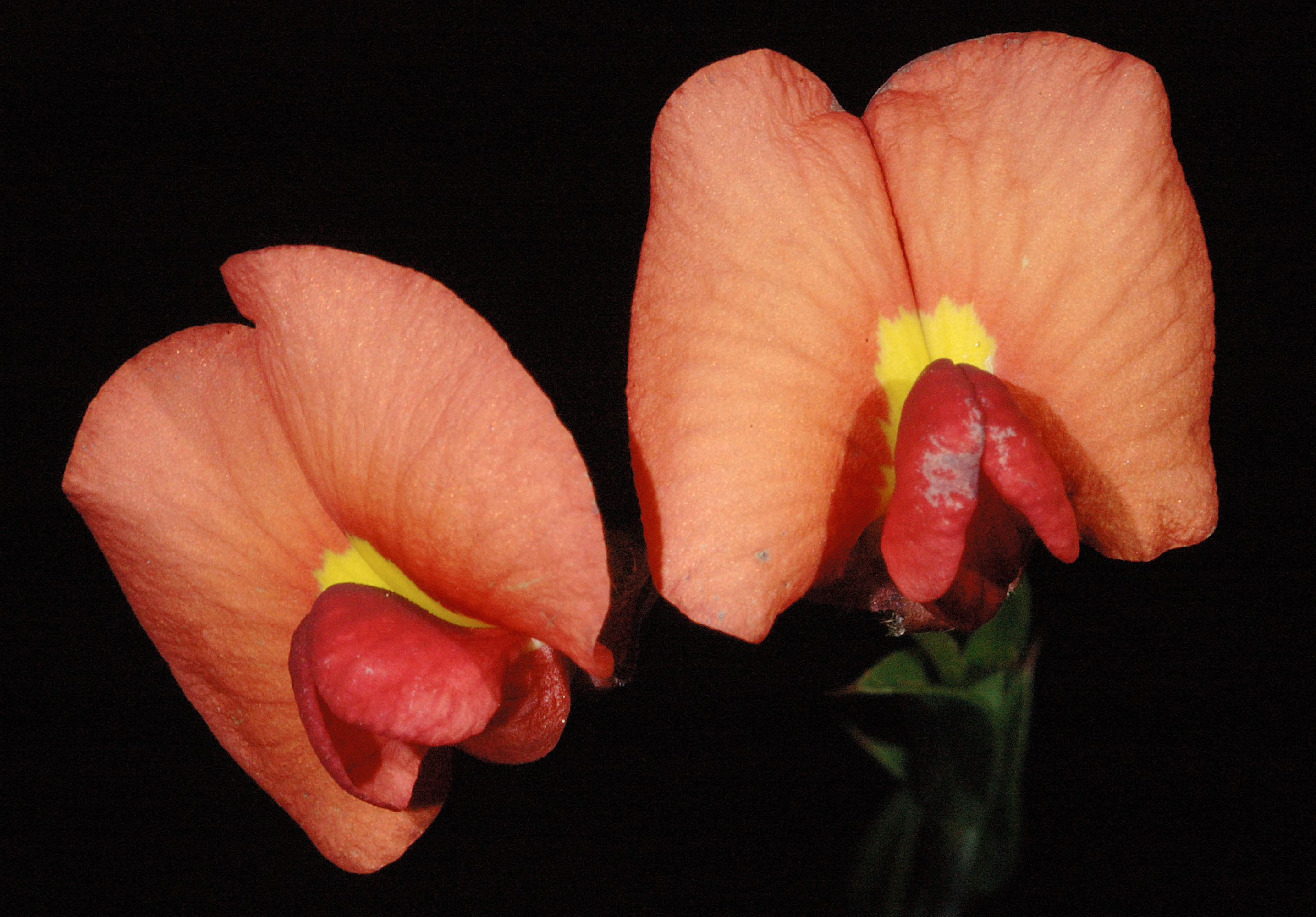
Flower detail

Chorizema dicksonii, commonly known as yellow-eyed flame pea, is a species of flowering plant in the family Fabaceae and is endemic to the southwest of Western Australia. It is an erect or spreading shrub with oblong to lance-shaped leaves and red and orange flowers.

== Description ==
Chorizema dicksonii is an erect or spreading shrub that typically grows to a height of 30–100 cm (12–39 in). Its leaves are oblong to lance-shaped or almost linear, up to 19 mm (0.75 in) long and rigid, tapering to a sharp point on the end. The flowers are arranged in loose, spike-like racemes on the ends of branches, each flower on a short pedicel. The sepals are silky-hairy, about 8 mm (0.31 in) long, the upper two lobes joined for about half their length. The petals are red and orange, the standard petal nearly twice as long as the sepals, the wings slightly longer than the sepals, and the keel shorter and curved with an erect point on the end. Flowering occurs from August to December.

== Taxonomy ==
Chorizema dicksonii was first formally described in 1839 by Robert Graham in the Edinburgh New Philosophical Journal from specimens "raised from seeds obtained by Messrs. James Dickson and Sons, Edinburgh, from Swan River".

== Distribution and habitat ==
Yellow-eyed flame pea grows on rocky hillsides and ridges in the Avon Wheatbelt, Jarrah Forest and Swan Coastal Plain bioregions of south-western Western Australia.
