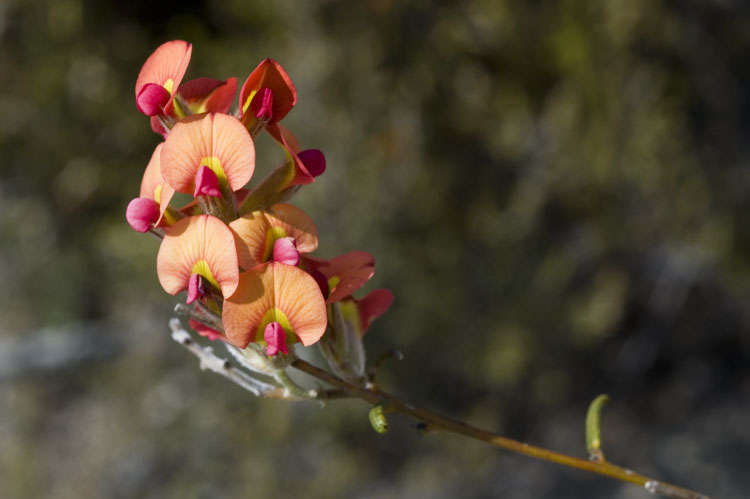

Scientific classification
- Kingdom: Plantae
- Clade: Tracheophytes
- Clade: Angiosperms
- Clade: Eudicots
- Clade: Rosids
- Order: Fabales
- Family: Fabaceae
- Subfamily: Faboideae
- Genus: Chorizema
- Species: C. uncinatum

Binomial name
- Chorizema uncinatum C.R.P.Andrews

= Chorizema uncinatum =

Species of legume

Chorizema uncinatum is a species of flowering plant in the family Fabaceae and is endemic to the south of Western Australia. It is an ascending or sprawling shrub with linear or narrowly oblong leaves and orange, pink or red, and red and yellow flowers.

== Description ==
Chorizema uncinatum is an ascending or sprawling shrub with branches under 0.3 cm (0.12 in) long and silky-hairy near the end. Its leaves are linear to narrowly oblong, 7–15 mm (0.28–0.59 in) long and 1.2–2.2 mm (0.047–0.087 in) wide. The flowers are arranged in spike-like racemes, each flower on a pedicel 1.0–1.5 mm (0.039–0.059 in) long. The sepals are silky-hairy and 9.5–10.5 mm (0.37–0.41 in) long. The flowers are orange, pink or red, and red and yellow, the standard petal 10–15 mm (0.39–0.59 in) long, the wings 10–11 mm (0.39–0.43 in) long, and the keel 9–12 mm (0.35–0.47 in) long. Flowering occurs from August to October.

== Taxonomy ==
Chorizema uncinatum was first formally described in 1904 by Cecil Rollo Payton Andrews in the Journal of the West Australian Natural History Society from specimens he collected in the Stirling Ranges "in October 1903". The specific epithet (uncinatum) means "hooked".

== Distribution and habitat ==
This species of pea grows in flats and sandplains in sandy soils with gravel, clay or loam in the Avon Wheatbelt, Esperance Plains, Jarrah Forest and Mallee bioregions of southern Western Australia.

== Conservation status ==
Chorizema uncinatum is listed as "not threatened" by the Western Australian Government Department of Biodiversity, Conservation and Attractions.
