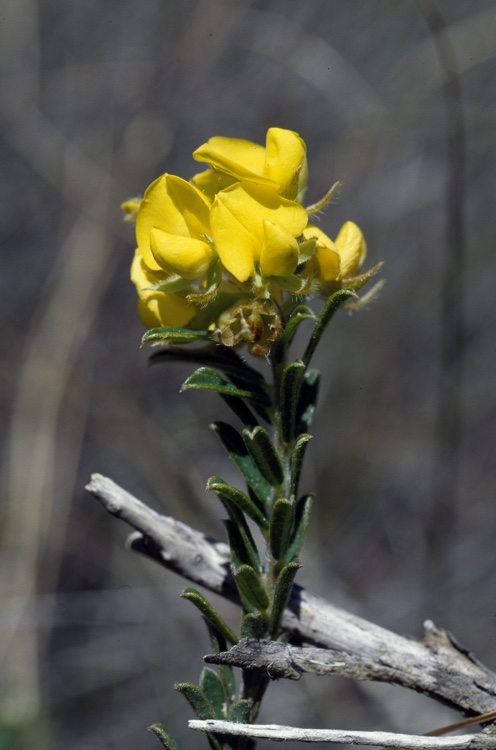
- Near the South Coast Highway, Western Australia

Conservation status
- Priority Three — Poorly Known Taxa (DEC)

Scientific classification
- Kingdom: Plantae
- Clade: Tracheophytes
- Clade: Angiosperms
- Clade: Eudicots
- Clade: Rosids
- Order: Fabales
- Family: Fabaceae
- Subfamily: Faboideae
- Genus: Chorizema
- Species: C. carinatum

Binomial name
- Chorizema carinatum (Meisn.) J.M.Taylor & Crisp

Synonyms
- Callistachys carinata Meisn.; Chorisema pubescens Turcz. orth. var.; Chorizema pubescens Turcz.; Oxylobium carinatum (Meisn.) Benth.

= Chorizema carinatum =

Species of legume

Chorizema carinatum is a species of flowering plant in the family Fabaceae and is endemic to the southwest of Western Australia. It is an erect or spreading shrub with sharply-pointed leaves and bright yellow flowers.

== Description ==
Chorizema carinatum is an erect or spreading shrub that typically grows to a height of 10–60 cm (3.9–23.6 in). The leaves are scattered, leathery, oblong or lance-shaped and up to 25 mm (0.98 in) long with a small, rigid, sharply-pointed, down-turned tip on the ends. The flowers are arranged on the ends of branches in racemes 25–50 mm (0.98–1.97 in) long, each flower on a short pedicel. The sepals are 6.0–8.5 mm (0.24–0.33 in) long and silky-hairy, the petals yellow and often barely longer than the sepals. Flowering occurs from October to December.

== Taxonomy ==
This species was first formally described in 1844 by Carl Meissner who gave it the name Callistachys carinata in Lehmann's Plantae Preissianae from specimens collected in Kent in 1840. In 1992, Joan Taylor and Michael Crisp transferred the species to Chorizema as C. carinatum in Australian Systematic Botany. The specific epithet (carinatum) means "keeled", referring to the leaves.

== Distribution and habitat ==
Chorizema carinatum grows in sand and sandy clay in the Avon Wheatbelt, Esperance Plains, Jarrah Forest and Swan Coastal Plain bioregions of south-western Western Australia.

== Conservation status ==
This pea is listed as "Priority Three" by the Western Australian Government Department of Biodiversity, Conservation and Attractions.
