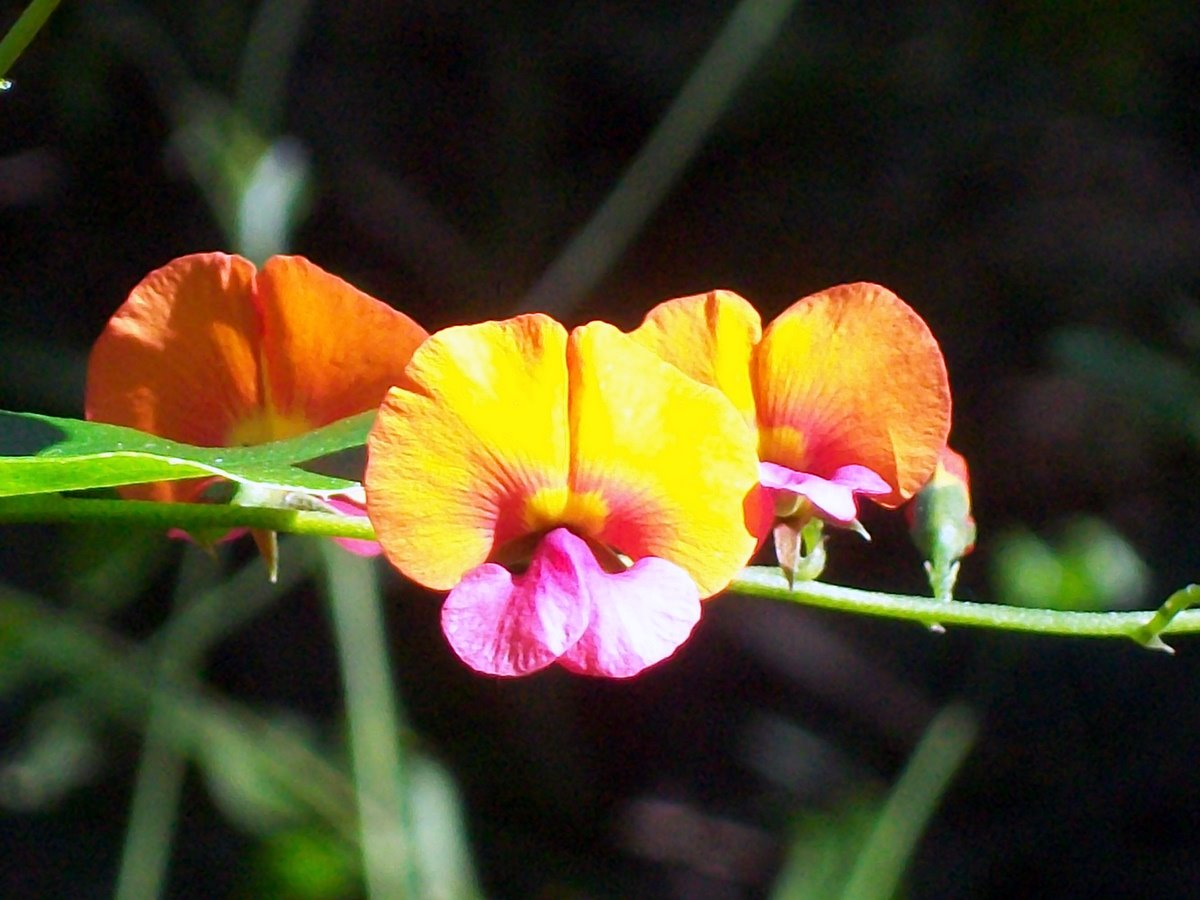

Scientific classification
- Kingdom: Plantae
- Clade: Tracheophytes
- Clade: Angiosperms
- Clade: Eudicots
- Clade: Rosids
- Order: Fabales
- Family: Fabaceae
- Subfamily: Faboideae
- Genus: Chorizema
- Species: C. cordatum

Binomial name
- Chorizema cordatum Lindl.

= Chorizema cordatum =

Species of legume

Chorizema cordatum, commonly known as heart-leaf flame pea, is a species of flowering plant in the family Fabaceae and is endemic to the southwest of Western Australia. Noongar people know the plant as kaly. It is a woody, erect, scrambling or climbing shrub with heart-shaped leaves, the flowers usually brightly coloured in yellow, orange and red.

== Description ==
Chorizema cordatum is an erect, scrambling or climbing shrub that typically grows up to 1 m (3 ft 3 in) high and 1.5 m (4 ft 11 in) wide. Its leaves are heart-shaped, 30–50 mm (1.2–2.0 in) long with a stipule at the base of the petiole, and often have wavy, toothed or lobed edges. The flowers are arranged in racemes up to 120 mm (4.7 in) long on the ends of branches or in leaf axils, the flowers 10–12 mm (0.39–0.47 in) wide, with various combinations of yellow, orange and red to pink. Flowering occurs from July to December.

== Taxonomy ==
Chorizema cordatum was first formally described in 1838 by John Lindley in Edwards's Botanical Register from specimens raised by Robert Mangles in London from seed collected in the Swan River Colony. The specific epithet (caudatum) means "heart-shaped".

== Distribution and habitat ==
Heart-leaf flame pea grows in forest, on rocky outcrops, along watercourses and on winter-wet flats in the Geraldton Sandplains, Jarrah Forest, Swan Coastal Plain and Warren bioregions of south-western Western Australia.

== Use in horticulture ==
This species can be grown as a garden plant, and does well in other parts of the country, (such as Sydney on the other side of the Australian continent). However, a summer with lower humidity is better suited for this plant. As it does not tolerate freezing, in cooler areas it requires the protection of glass. Propagation from seed is easily achieved, and cuttings strike well.
