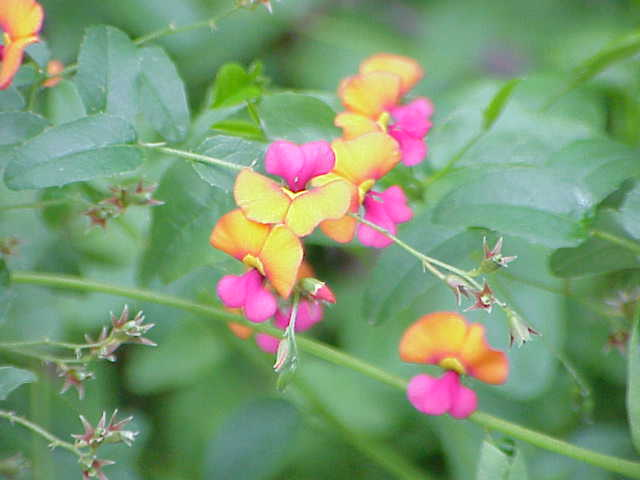
- Chorizema cordatum

Scientific classification
- Kingdom: Plantae
- Clade: Tracheophytes
- Clade: Angiosperms
- Clade: Eudicots
- Clade: Rosids
- Order: Fabales
- Family: Fabaceae
- Subfamily: Faboideae
- Clade: Mirbelioids
- Genus: Chorizema; Labill.

Type species
- Chorizema ilicifolium Labill.

Species
- See text

Synonyms
- Chorisema Fisch. orth. var.; Chorosema Brongn. orth. var.; Chorozema Sm. orth. var.; Chorysema Jacques orth. var.; Choryzema Bosc orth. var.; Orthotropis Benth. ex Lindl.

= Chorizema =

Genus of legumes

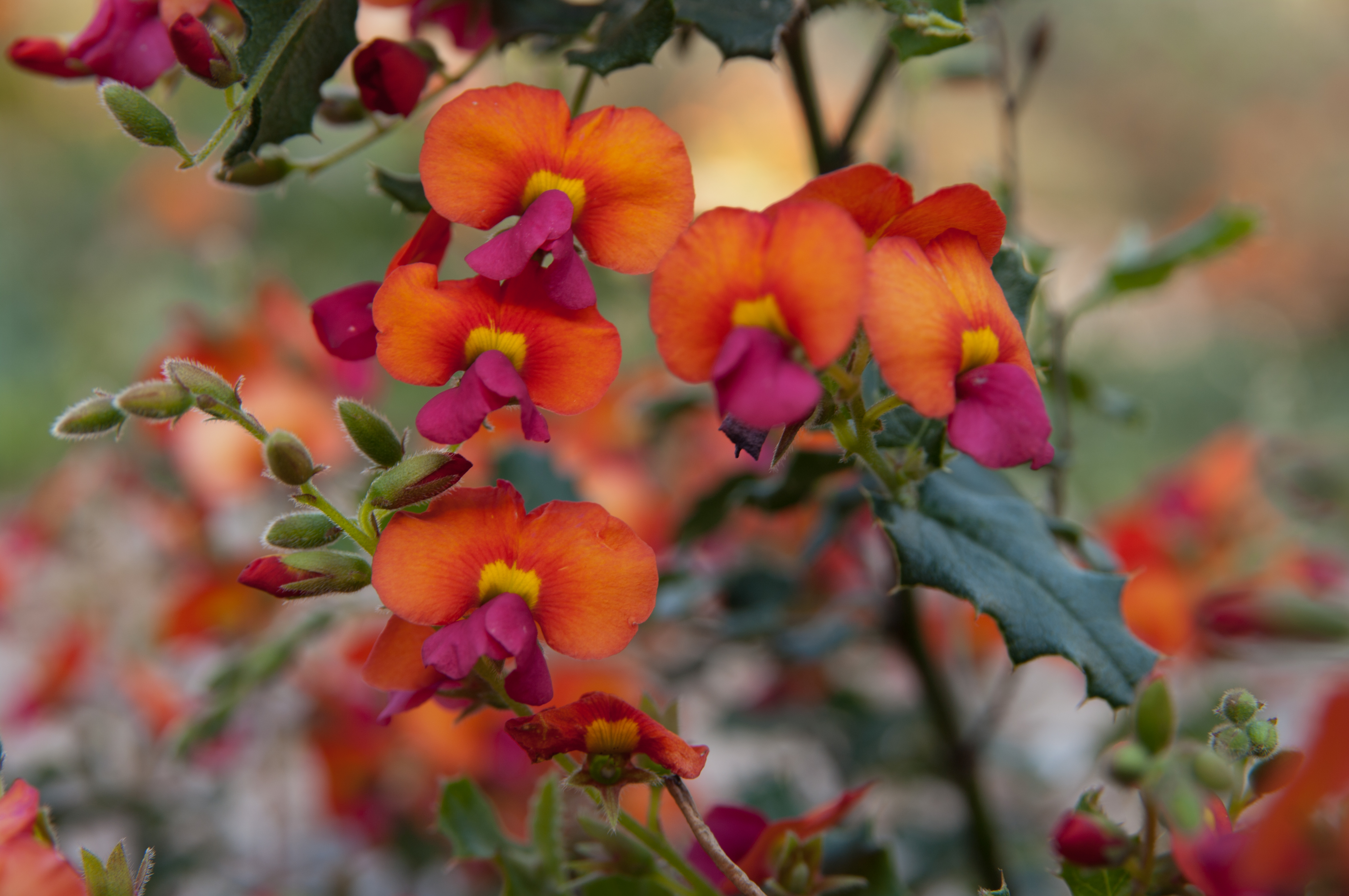
Chorizema varium

Chorizema, commonly known as flame peas, is a genus of flowering plants in the family Fabaceae and is endemic to Australia.

== Description ==
Plants in the genus Chorizema are mostly shrubs or subshrubs, sometimes climbers, usually with simple leaves arranged in opposite pairs, the flowers usually arranged in racemes, each flower on a short pedicel. The sepal lobes are more or less equal, the upper pair broader and partly joined, the standard petal more or less round or kidney-shaped, the wings oblong and much longer than the keel. The fruit is an oval pod containing 4 to 32 seeds.

== Taxonomy ==
The genus Chorizema was first formally described in 1800 by Jacques Labillardière in his Relation du Voyage à la Recherche de la Pérouse, and the first species he described (the type species) was Chorizema ilicifolium. The genus name (Chorizema) means "divided thread", Labillardière having noted that the stamens are separate from each other.

== Distribution ==
Flame peas are endemic to the south-west of Western Australia, apart from C. parviflorum that occurs in New South Wales and Queensland.

== Use in horticulture ==
This genus of peas is valued in cultivation for their colourful flowers. Most species do not tolerate frost, and in temperate regions require the protection of glass.

== Species list ==
The following species and subspecies are accepted by the Australian Plant Census as of June 2020:

- Chorizema aciculare (DC.) C.A.Gardner
  - Chorizema aciculare (DC.) C.A.Gardner subsp. aciculare
  - Chorizema aciculare subsp. laxum J.M.Taylor & Crisp
- Chorizema carinatum (Meisn.) J.M.Taylor & Crisp
- Chorizema circinale J.M.Taylor & Crisp
- Chorizema cordatum Lindl.
- Chorizema cytisoides Turcz.
- Chorizema dicksonii Graham
- Chorizema diversifolium A.DC.
- Chorizema genistoides (Meisn.) C.A.Gardner
- Chorizema glycinifolium (Sm.) Druce
- Chorizema humile Turcz.
- Chorizema ilicifolium Labill.
- Chorizema nanum (Andrews) Sims
- Chorizema nervosum T.Moore
- Chorizema obtusifolium (Sweet) J.M.Taylor & Crisp
- Chorizema parviflorum Benth.
- Chorizema racemosum (Meisn.) J.M.Taylor & Crisp
- Chorizema reticulatum Meisn.
- Chorizema retrorsum J.M.Taylor & Crisp
- Chorizema rhombeum R.Br.
- Chorizema rhynchotropis Meisn.
- Chorizema spathulatum (Meisn.) J.M.Taylor & Crisp
- Chorizema trigonum Turcz.
- Chorizema ulotropis J.M.Taylor & Crisp
- Chorizema uncinatum C.R.P.Andrews
- Chorizema varium Paxton

== Hybrids ==
The following hybrids have been described:

- Chorizema ×lowii Hort. ex Rev.
