= Chorizema rhynchotropis =

Scientific classification
- Kingdom: Plantae
- Clade: Tracheophytes
- Clade: Angiosperms
- Clade: Eudicots
- Clade: Rosids
- Order: Fabales
- Family: Fabaceae
- Subfamily: Faboideae
- Genus: Chorizema
- Species: C. rhynchotropis

Binomial name
- Chorizema rhynchotropis Meisn.

Species of legume

Chorizema rhynchotropis is a species of flowering plant in the family Fabaceae and is endemic to the southwest of Western Australia. It is a straggling, sprawling or erect shrub with linear, sharply-pointed leaves, and orange or red and pink and yellow pea flowers.

== Description ==
Chorizema rhynchotropis is a straggling, sprawling or erect shrub with glabrous arching stems. Its leaves are linear, sharply-pointed, 4–18 mm (0.16–0.71 in) long 0.8–1.2 mm (0.031–0.047 in) wide and hairy. The flowers are orange, or red and pink and yellow, arranged in racemes on the ends of the branches, often forming long, leafy panicles, each flower on a pedicel 3.0–6.5 mm (0.12–0.26 in) long. The sepals are silky-hairy, about 6.5 mm (0.26 in) long, the lobes longer than the sepal tube. The standard petal is 11–13 mm (0.43–0.51 in) long, the wings 9–10 mm (0.35–0.39 in) long, and the keel 10.0–10.9 mm (0.39–0.43 in) long. Flowering occurs from August to November.

== Taxonomy and naming ==
Chorizema rhynchotropis was first formally described in 1848 by Carl Meissner in Lehmann's Plantae Preissianae. The specific epithet (rhynchotropis) means "a snout-shaped keel".

== Distribution and habitat ==
This chorizema grows on sandplains in sandy or gravelly soils in the Avon Wheatbelt and Geraldton Sandplains bioregions of south-western Western Australia.
