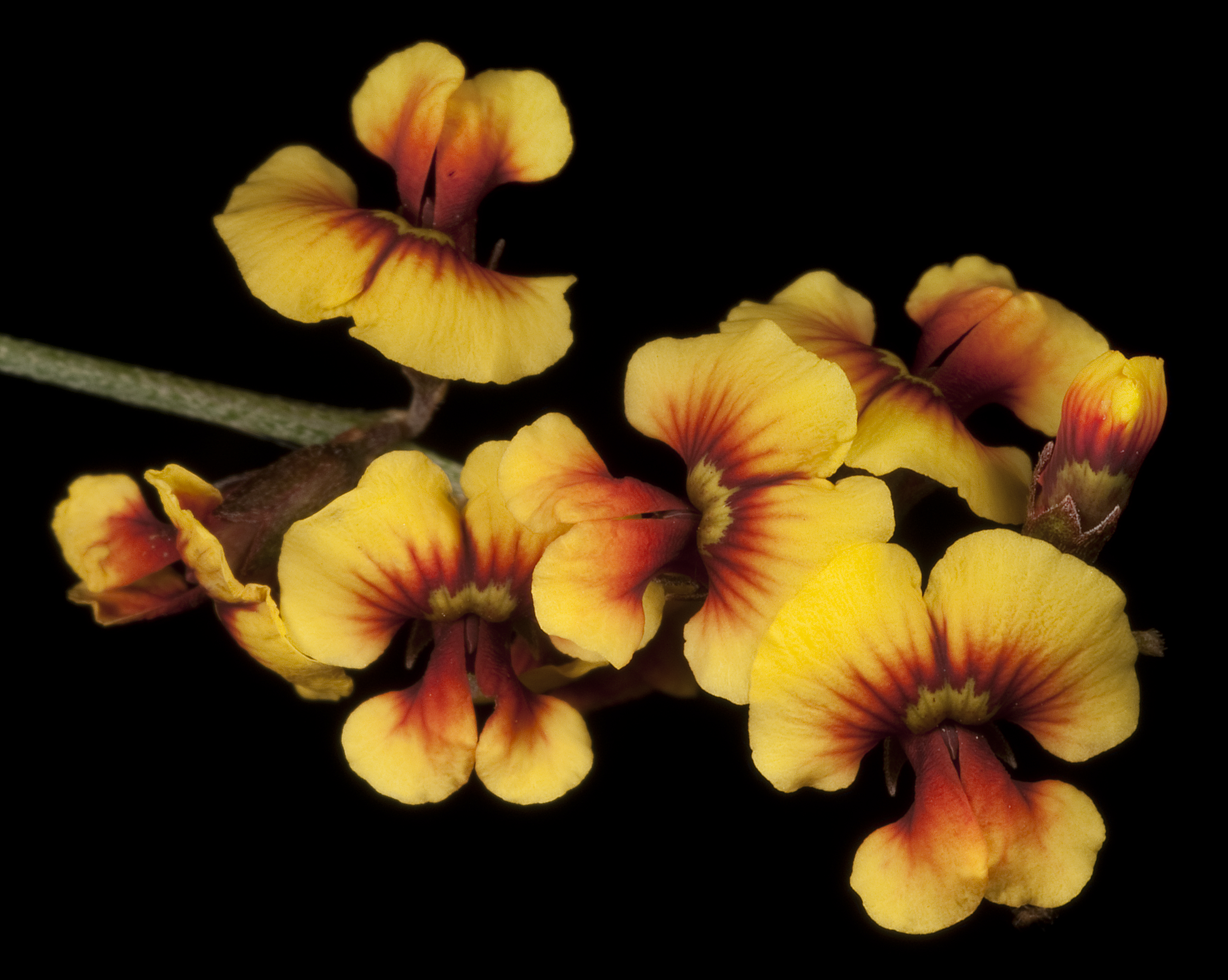

Conservation status
- Priority Three — Poorly Known Taxa (DEC)

Scientific classification
- Kingdom: Plantae
- Clade: Tracheophytes
- Clade: Angiosperms
- Clade: Eudicots
- Clade: Rosids
- Order: Fabales
- Family: Fabaceae
- Subfamily: Faboideae
- Genus: Chorizema
- Species: C. genistoides

Binomial name
- Chorizema genistoides (Meisn.) C.A.Gardner

Synonyms
- Oxylobium genistoides Meisn.

= Chorizema genistoides =

Species of legume

Chorizema genistoides is a species of flowering plant in the family Fabaceae and is endemic to the south-west of Western Australia. It is a low-lying, spreading or erect that typically grows to a height of 20–60 cm (7.9–23.6 in) and has yellow and red, pea-like flowers. It was first formally described in 1855 by Carl Meissner, who gave it the name Oxylobium genistoides in Botanische Zeitung from specimens collected by James Drummond. In 1930, Charles Gardner transferred the species to Chorizema as C. genistoides. The specific epithet (genistoides) means "Genista-like".

Chorizema genistoides grows in sandy and clayey soils on scree slopes and on hills in the Avon Wheatbelt, Mallee, Murchison and Yalgoo bioregions of south-western Western Australia. The species is listed as "not threatened" by the Western Australian Government Department of Biodiversity, Conservation and Attractions.
