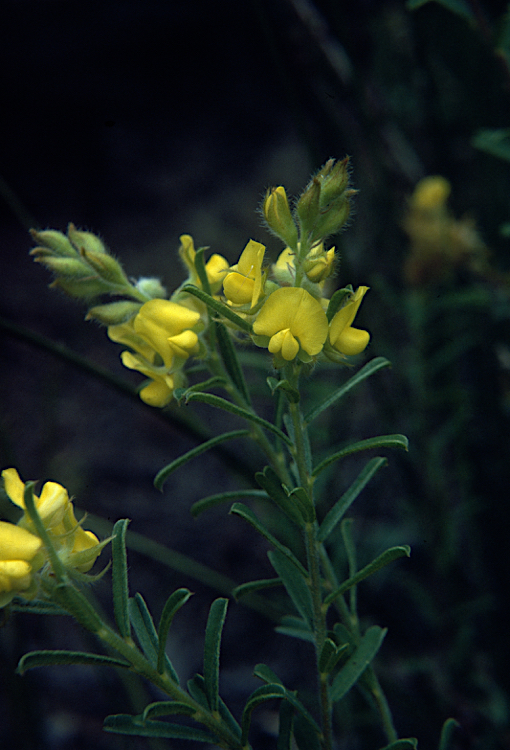

Scientific classification
- Kingdom: Plantae
- Clade: Tracheophytes
- Clade: Angiosperms
- Clade: Eudicots
- Clade: Rosids
- Order: Fabales
- Family: Fabaceae
- Subfamily: Faboideae
- Genus: Chorizema
- Species: C. spathulatum

Binomial name
- Chorizema spathulatum (Meisn.) J.M.Taylor & Crisp

Synonyms
- Callistachys spathulata Meisn.; Oxylobium spathulatum (Meisn.) Benth.

= Chorizema spathulatum =

Species of legume

Chorizema spathulatum is a species of flowering plant in the family Fabaceae and is endemic to the southwest of Western Australia. It is an erect or low-lying shrub with linear to wedge-shaped or almost oblong leaves, and yellow pea flowers.

== Description ==
Chorizema spathulatum is an erect or low-lying shrub with glabrous hairy stems. Its leaves are linear to wedge-shaped or almost oblong, 7–35 mm (0.28–1.38 in) long 2–6 mm (0.079–0.236 in) wide and hairy. The flowers are yellow, arranged in racemes on the ends of the branches, each flower on a pedicel 2.0–3.5 mm (0.079–0.138 in) long and hairy with bracteoles at the base but that fall of as the flowers open. The sepals are silky-hairy, about 8–10 mm (0.31–0.39 in) long, the upper two lobes broader. The flowers are yellow, 8–10 mm (0.31–0.39 in) long, the standard petal 9–10 mm (0.35–0.39 in) long, the wings 8.5–10 mm (0.33–0.39 in) long, and the keel 9–10.5 mm (0.35–0.41 in) long. Flowering occurs from October to December and the fruit is a pod 10–11 mm (0.39–0.43 in) long and 6–8 mm (0.24–0.31 in) wide.

== Taxonomy and naming ==
This species was first formally described in 1848 by Carl Meissner who gave it the name Callistachys spathulata in Lehmann's Plantae Preissianae. In 1992, Joan M. Taylor and Michael Crisp transferred the species to Chorizema as C. spathulatum in Australian Systematic Botany. The specific epithet (spathulatum) means "spoon-shaped", referring to the leaves.

== Distribution and habitat ==
Chorizema spathulatum usually grows in sandy soil in the Jarrah Forest and Swan Coastal Plain bioregions of south-western Western Australia.
