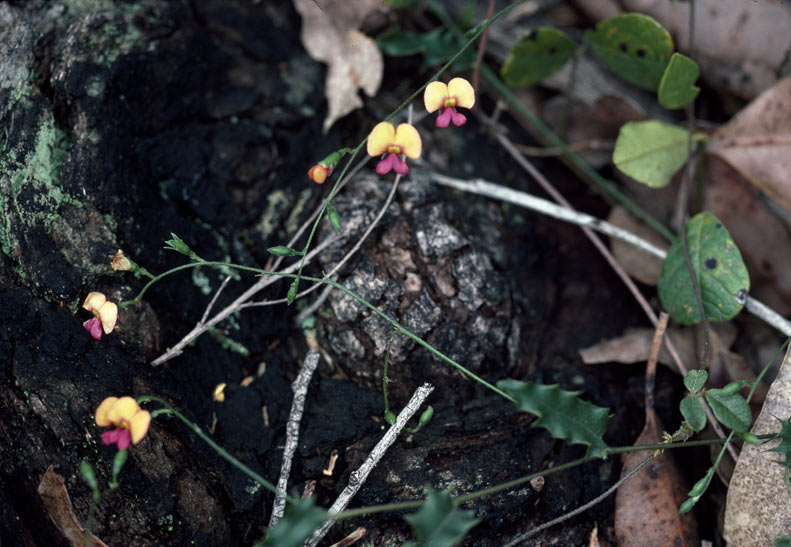
- In Porongurup National Park

Scientific classification
- Kingdom: Plantae
- Clade: Tracheophytes
- Clade: Angiosperms
- Clade: Eudicots
- Clade: Rosids
- Order: Fabales
- Family: Fabaceae
- Subfamily: Faboideae
- Genus: Chorizema
- Species: C. nanum

Binomial name
- Chorizema nanum (Andrews) Sims

Synonyms
- Chorizema nana R.Br. orth. var.; Pultenaea nana Andrews; Chorizema ilicifolium auct. non Labill.: Smith, J.E. (1808); Chorizema ilicifolium auct. non Labill.: Dumont de Courset, G.L.M. (1814); Chorizema ilicifolium auct. non Labill.: Bonpland, A.J.A. (1815); Chorizema ilicifolium auct. non Labill.: Bentham, G.(5 October 1864)

= Chorizema nanum =

Species of legume

Chorizema nanum is a species of flowering plant in the family Fabaceae and is endemic to the south-west of Western Australia. It is a slender, erect to spreading or low-lying shrub with holly-like leaves and yellow and pink, pea-like flowers.

== Description ==
Chorizema nanum is a slender, erect to spreading or low-lying shrub that typically grows to a height of up to 40 cm (16 in). Its leaves are stiff and holly-like, elliptic with undulating, spiny lobes. The flowers are yellow and pink, arranged in racemes in leaf axils, each flower on a short pedicel, the sepals joined at the base with two "lips". The standard petal is yellow with a notched tip and a red, streaked star-shape at the base. The wings crimson narrow and about the same length as the standard and the keel white with purple tips and less than half as long as the wings.

== Taxonomy ==
This species was first formally described in 1806 by Henry Cranke Andrews, who gave it the name Pultenaea nana in The Botanist's Repository for New, and Rare Plants. In 1807, John Sims transferred the species to Chorizema as C. nanum in the Botanical Magazine. The specific epithet (nanum) means "dwarf".

== Distribution and habitat ==
Chorizema nanum grows in sandy soils and clay loam on scree slopes and on hills in the Esperance Plains, Jarrah Forest, Swan Coastal Plain and Warren bioregions of south-western Western Australia. The species is listed as "not threatened" by the Western Australian Government Department of Biodiversity, Conservation and Attractions.
