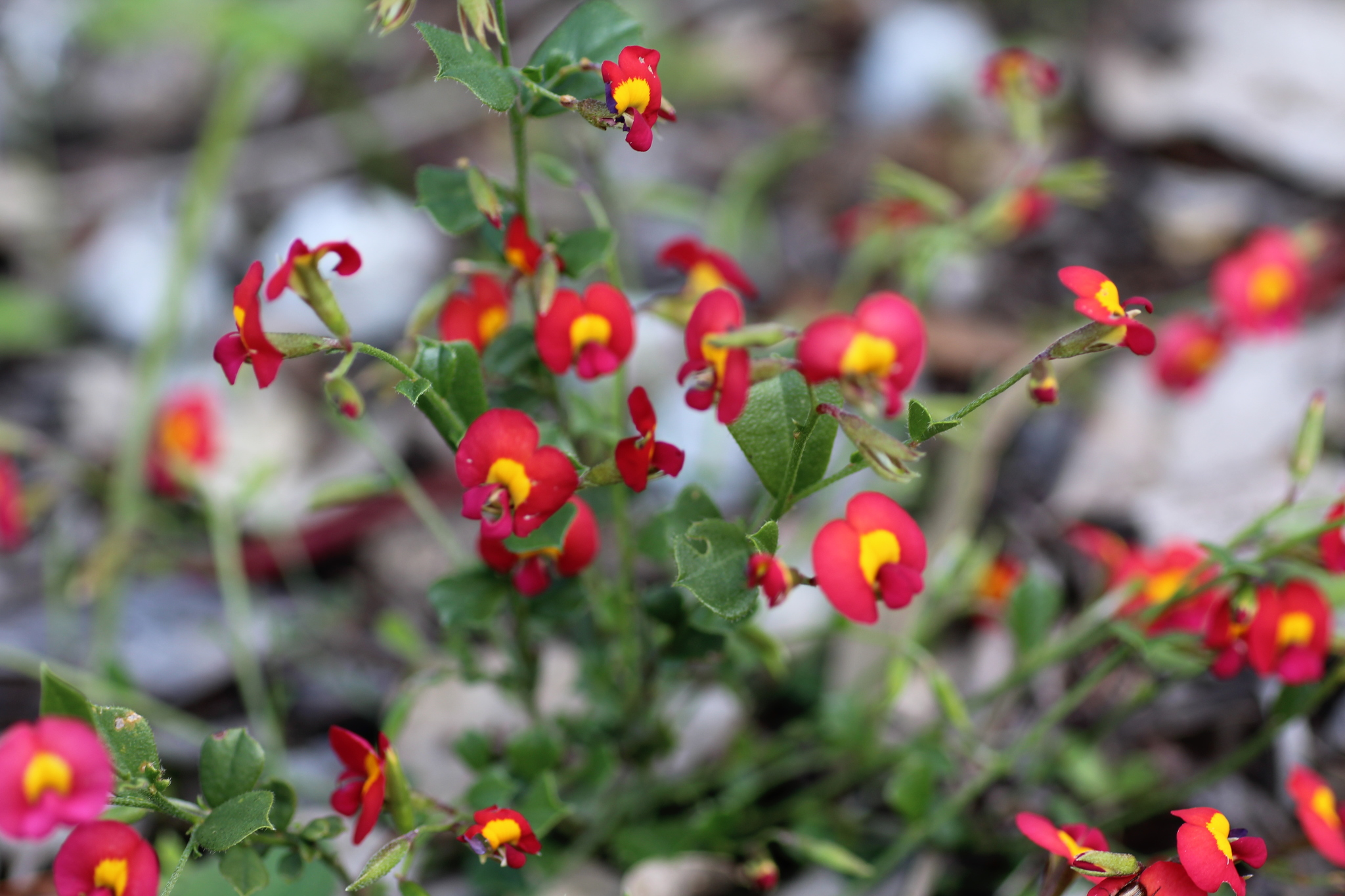
- Near Dunsborough

Scientific classification
- Kingdom: Plantae
- Clade: Tracheophytes
- Clade: Angiosperms
- Clade: Eudicots
- Clade: Rosids
- Order: Fabales
- Family: Fabaceae
- Subfamily: Faboideae
- Genus: Chorizema
- Species: C. rhombeum

Binomial name
- Chorizema rhombeum R.Br.

= Chorizema rhombeum =

Species of legume

Chorizema rhombeum is a species of flowering plant in the family Fabaceae and is endemic to the southwest of Western Australia. It is a prostrate to ascending or twining shrub with egg-shaped or rhombic leaves, and orange to pink, or red and yellow pea flowers.

== Description ==
Chorizema rhombeum is a prostrate to ascending or twining shrub. Its leaves are egg-shaped with the narrower end towards the base, or rhombic, 7–25 mm (0.28–0.98 in) long and 6–8 mm (0.24–0.31 in) wide, the upper leaves often lance-shaped and longer. The flowers are orange to pink, or red and yellow, arranged on a peduncle each flower on a pedicel 3.0–3.4 mm (0.12–0.13 in) long. The sepals are 9–10 mm (0.35–0.39 in) long and hairy, the upper lobes joined above the middle. The standard petal is 4–10 mm (0.16–0.39 in) long and glabrous, the wings 11–12 mm (0.43–0.47 in) long, and the keel is 9–11 mm (0.35–0.43 in) long. Flowering occurs from August to December and the pod is about 6 mm (0.24 in) long.

== Taxonomy and naming ==
Chorizema rhombeum was first formally described in 1811 by Robert Brown in William Aiton's Hortus Kewensis. The specific epithet (rhombeum) means "rhombus", referring to the shape of the leaves.

== Distribution and habitat ==
Chorizema rhombeum grows on gentle slopes, river banks and on exposed coastal sites from about Perth to the Stirling Range in the Esperance Plains, Jarrah Forest, Swan Coastal Plain and Warren bioregions of south-western Western Australia.
