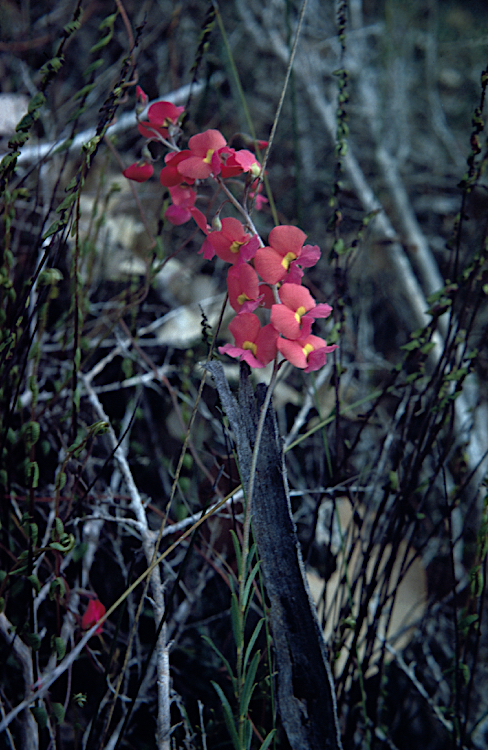
- Near Manjimup

Scientific classification
- Kingdom: Plantae
- Clade: Tracheophytes
- Clade: Angiosperms
- Clade: Eudicots
- Clade: Rosids
- Order: Fabales
- Family: Fabaceae
- Subfamily: Faboideae
- Genus: Chorizema
- Species: C. reticulatum

Binomial name
- Chorizema reticulatum Meisn.

= Chorizema reticulatum =

Species of legume

Chorizema reticulatum is a species of flowering plant in the family Fabaceae and is endemic to the southwest of Western Australia. It is a shrub with erect or ascending stems, crowded lance-shaped leaves, and pink and orange pea flowers.

== Description ==
Chorizema reticulatum is a shrub with erect or ascending stems up to 15–30 cm (5.9–11.8 in) long. Its leaves are crowded, lance-shaped, 1.3–2.5 mm (0.051–0.098 in) long and keeled on the lower surface. The flowers are pink and orange, arranged in racemes on the edges of the branches and up to 15 mm (0.59 in) long, including a long peduncle, each flower on a short pedicel. The sepals are silky-hairy, about 4.5 mm (0.18 in) long, the lobes almost as long as the sepal tube. The standard petal is about twice as long as the sepals, the wings nearly as long as the standard, and the keel about the same length as the sepals. Flowering occurs from August to October.

== Taxonomy and naming ==
Chorizema reticulatum was first formally described in 1844 by Carl Meissner in Lehmann's Plantae Preissianae. The specific epithet (reticulatum) means "with the appearance of a net", referring to the venation of the leaves.

== Distribution and habitat ==
Chorizema reticulatum grows on sand over laterite in the Esperance Plains, Jarrah Forest, Swan Coastal Plain and Warren bioregions of southern Western Australia.
