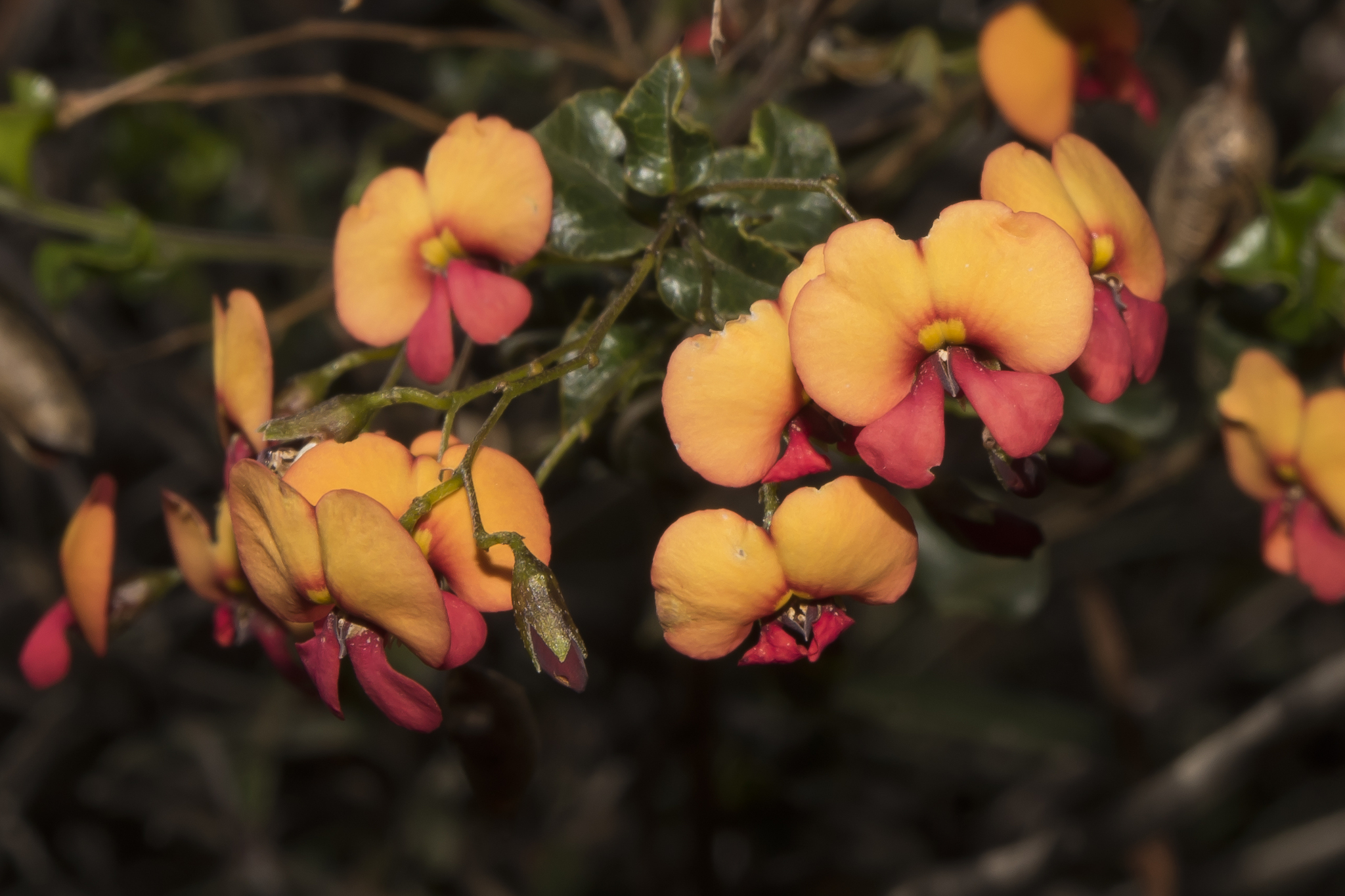
- Near Ravensthorpe

Scientific classification
- Kingdom: Plantae
- Clade: Tracheophytes
- Clade: Angiosperms
- Clade: Eudicots
- Clade: Rosids
- Order: Fabales
- Family: Fabaceae
- Subfamily: Faboideae
- Genus: Chorizema
- Species: C. nervosum

Binomial name
- Chorizema nervosum T.Moore

Synonyms
- Heterotypic Synonyms: Chorizema parvifolium Turcz.

= Chorizema nervosum =

Species of legume

Chorizema nervosum is a species of flowering plant in the family Fabaceae. It is endemic to the coast of southern Western Australia. It is an erect or spreading shrub with sharply-pointed, wavy, round to heart-shaped leaves, and yellowish-orange and red pea flowers.

== Description ==
Chorizema nervosum is an erect or spreading shrub that typically grows to a height of 20–80 cm (7.9–31.5 in) and has softly-hairy branches. Its leaves are round to heart-shaped, about 12 mm (0.47 in) long and often broader than long. They are also glabrous, leathery, wavy and sharply-pointed. The flowers are yellowish-orange and red, arranged in loose groups, the pedicels often as long as the sepals. The sepals are 4–5 mm (0.16–0.20 in) long, the upper two joined for about half their length. The standard petal is about 6.5 mm (0.26 in) long and broader than long, the wings nearly as long as the standard, and the keel much shorter than both. Flowering occurs from July to September, and the fruit is a pod about 12 mm (0.47 in) long.

== Taxonomy and naming ==
Chorizema nervosum was first formally described in 1852 by Thomas Moore in Arthur Henfrey's The Garden Companion. The specific epithet (nervosum) means "abounding in nerves", referring to the prominent veins in the leaves.

== Distribution and habitat ==
This species of pea grows in rocky gullies, breakaways and rocky gullies in near-coastal areas from near Jerramungup to Cape Arid National Park in the Esperance Plains and Mallee bioregions of southern Western Australia.
