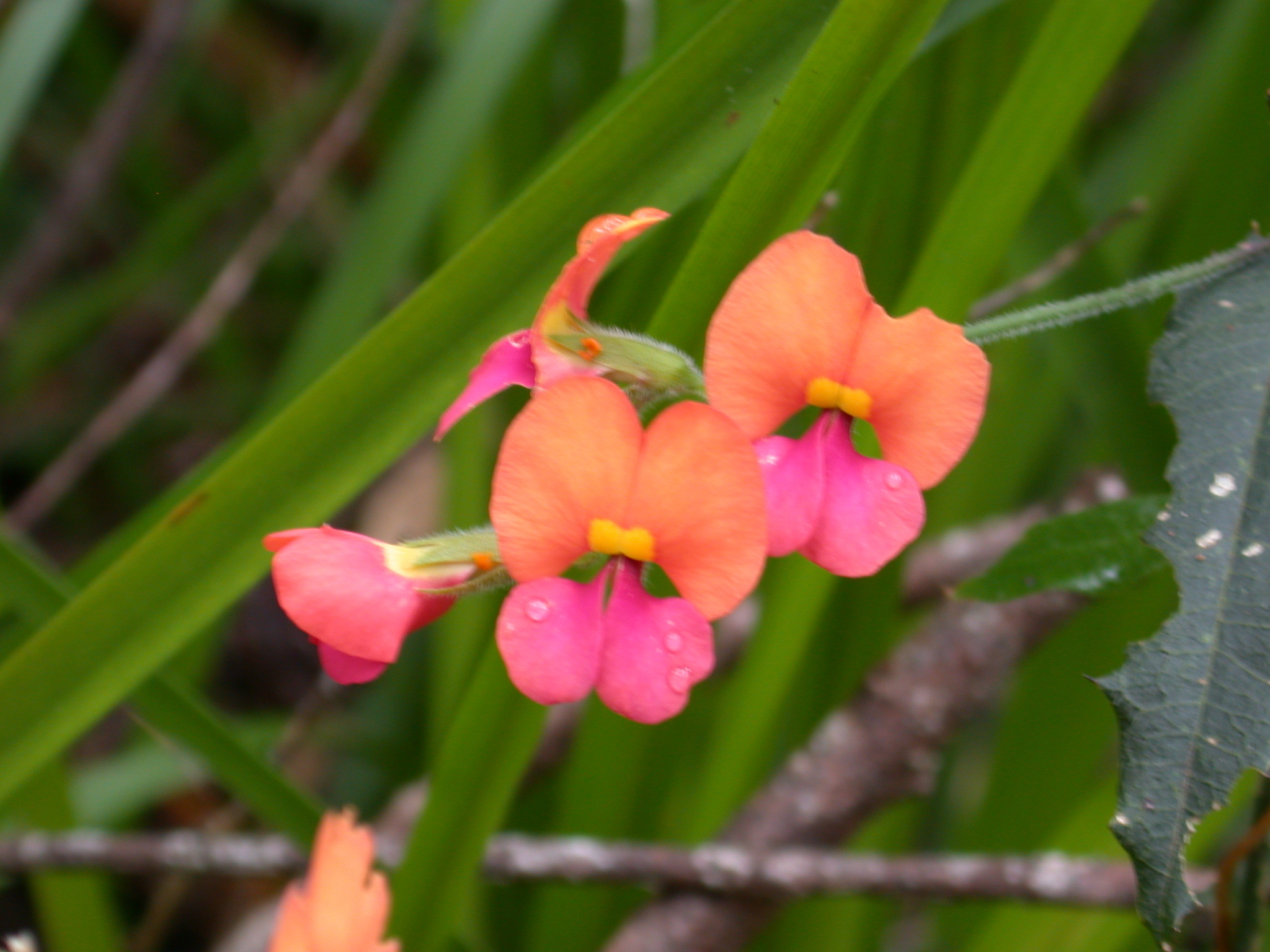
- Near Walpole

Scientific classification
- Kingdom: Plantae
- Clade: Tracheophytes
- Clade: Angiosperms
- Clade: Eudicots
- Clade: Rosids
- Order: Fabales
- Family: Fabaceae
- Subfamily: Faboideae
- Genus: Chorizema
- Species: C. retrorsum

Binomial name
- Chorizema retrorsum J.M.Taylor & Crisp

= Chorizema retrorsum =

Species of legume

Chorizema retrorsum is a species of flowering plant in the family Fabaceae and is endemic to the southwest of Western Australia. It is a trailing or erect to climbing shrub that typically grows to a height of 3 m (9.8 ft) high. It has orange-red, yellow and pink flowers from August to December.

It was first formally described in 1992 by Joan Taylor and Michael Crisp in the journal Australian Systematic Botany, from specimens collected between Walpole and Denmark.

Chorizema retrorsum grows in a range of soils from near Bunbury to Albany in the Jarrah Forest and Warren bioregions of southern Western Australia. The specific epithet (retrorsum) means "turned back", referring to the teeth on the leaf edges".
