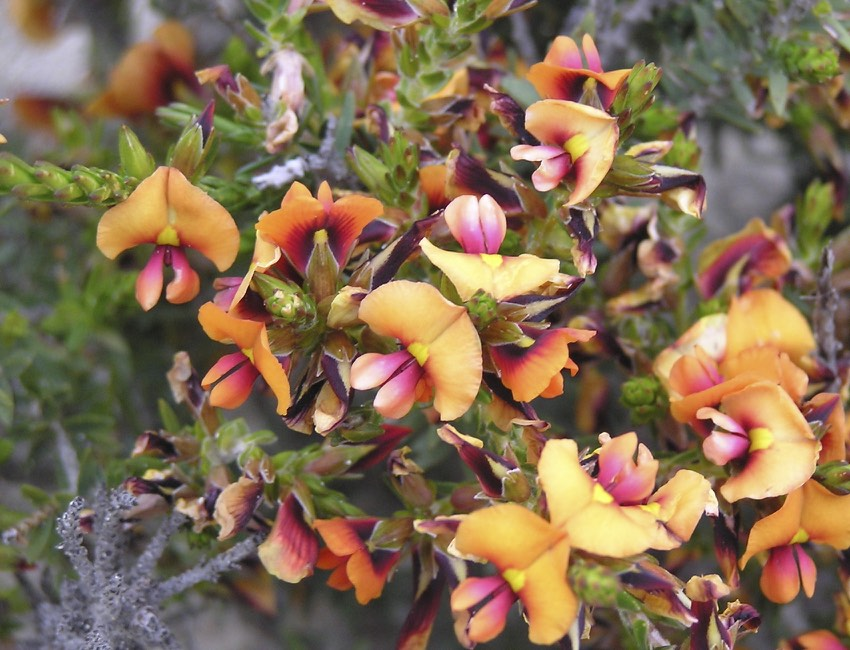
- In Cape Arid National Park

Scientific classification
- Kingdom: Plantae
- Clade: Tracheophytes
- Clade: Angiosperms
- Clade: Eudicots
- Clade: Rosids
- Order: Fabales
- Family: Fabaceae
- Subfamily: Faboideae
- Genus: Chorizema
- Species: C. obtusifolium

Binomial name
- Chorizema obtusifolium (Sweet) J.M.Taylor & Crisp

= Chorizema obtusifolium =

Species of legume

Chorizema obtusifolium is a species of flowering plant in the family Fabaceae and is endemic to the coast of southern Western Australia. It is an erect, spreading or trailing shrub with leathery, linear leaves, and orange, pinkish-orange and red pea flowers.

== Description ==
Chorizema obtusifolium is an erect, spreading or trailing shrub that typically grows to a height of 50 cm (20 in) with stems 30–46 cm (12–18 in) long. Its leaves are leathery and linear, 19–38 mm (0.75–1.50 in) long with the tip curve downwards. The flowers are orange, pinkish-orange and red, arranged in racemes 25–50 mm (0.98–1.97 in) long, each flower on a short pedicel. The sepals are 8.5–10.5 mm (0.33–0.41 in) long, the two upper lobes joined for most of their length. The standard petal is nearly twice as long as the sepals, the wings much shorter than the standard, and the keel shorter than the wings. Flowering occurs from September to November.

== Taxonomy and naming ==
This species was first formally described in 1827 by Robert Sweet who gave it the name Oxylobium obtusifolium in his Flora Australasica from specimens raised at Clapton Nursery by John Bain Mackay, from seed collected near King George Sound by William Baxter. In 1992, Joan M. Taylor and Michael Crisp transferred the species to Chorizema as C. obtusifolium in Australian Systematic Botany.

== Distribution and habitat ==
Chorizema obtusifolium grows on flats and sand dunes in near-coastal areas from near Jerramungup to Cape Arid National Park in the Esperance Plains and Mallee bioregions of southern Western Australia.
