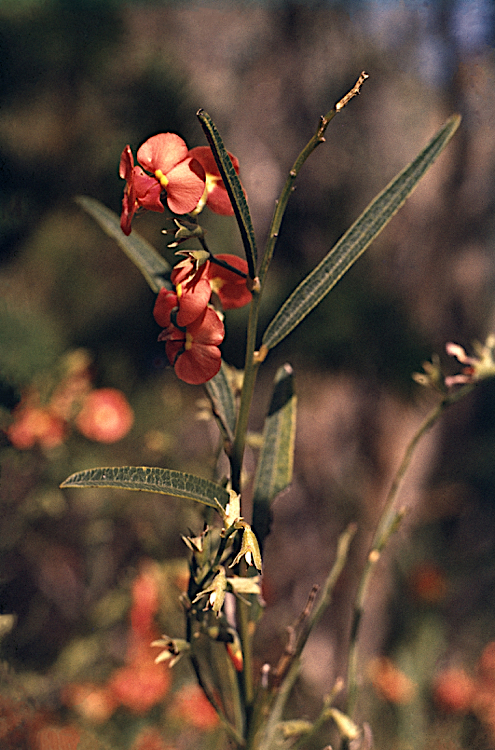

Scientific classification
- Kingdom: Plantae
- Clade: Tracheophytes
- Clade: Angiosperms
- Clade: Eudicots
- Clade: Rosids
- Order: Fabales
- Family: Fabaceae
- Subfamily: Faboideae
- Genus: Chorizema
- Species: C. trigonum

Binomial name
- Chorizema trigonum Turcz.

= Chorizema trigonum =

Species of legume

Chorizema trigonum is a species of flowering plant in the family Fabaceae and is endemic to the south of Western Australia. It is an erect, spindly shrub with linear to oblong leaves and orange, red and yellow flowers.

== Description ==
Chorizema trigonum is an erect, spindly shrub that typically grows to 0.3–1 m (1 ft 0 in – 3 ft 3 in) high and has glabrous branches. Its leaves are linear to oblong, 29–60 mm (1.1–2.4 in) long, 6–20 mm (0.24–0.79 in) wide, and leathery with a short, down-turned point on the end. The flowers are arranged in racemes in leaf axils or on the ends of branches, each flower on a pedicel about 2 mm (0.079 in) long. The sepals are softly-hairy and 7.5–9.4 mm (0.30–0.37 in) long, the upper two lobes joined for about half their length and curved. The flowers are orange, yellow and red, the standard petal 10–12 mm (0.39–0.47 in) long, wings 10–11 mm (0.39–0.43 in) long, and the keel 9.8–10.0 mm (0.39–0.39 in) long. Flowering occurs from September to November.

== Taxonomy ==
Chorizema trigonum was first formally described in 1853 by Nikolai Turczaninow in the Bulletin de la Société Impériale des Naturalistes de Moscou from specimens collected by James Drummond. The specific epithet (trigonum) means "three-angled", referring to the stem.

== Distribution and habitat ==
This species of pea grows in coastal areas in sandy or stony soils in the Esperance Plains bioregion of southern Western Australia.

== Conservation status ==
Chorizema trigonum is listed as "not threatened" by the Western Australian Government Department of Biodiversity, Conservation and Attractions.
