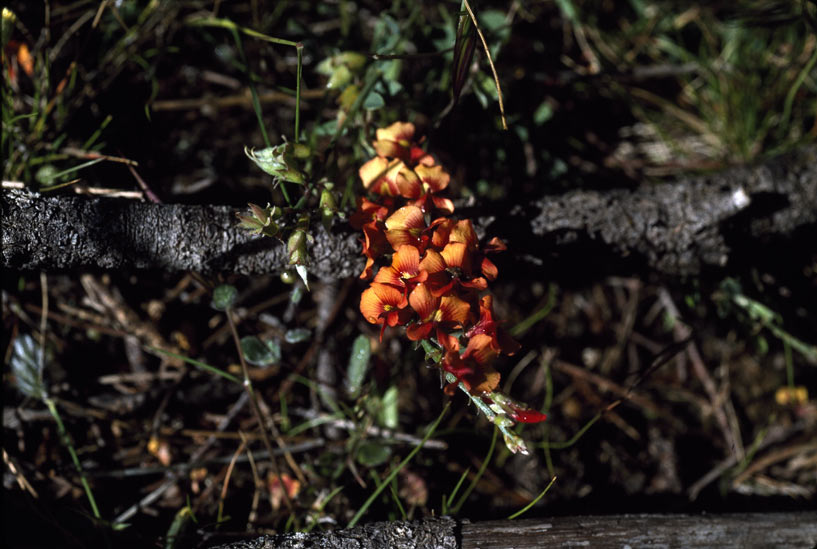
- Near Coorow

Conservation status
- Declared rare (DEC)

Scientific classification
- Kingdom: Plantae
- Clade: Tracheophytes
- Clade: Angiosperms
- Clade: Eudicots
- Clade: Rosids
- Order: Fabales
- Family: Fabaceae
- Subfamily: Faboideae
- Genus: Chorizema
- Species: C. humile

Binomial name
- Chorizema humile Turcz.

= Chorizema humile =

Species of legume

Chorizema humile is a species of flowering plant in the family Fabaceae and is endemic to the southwest of Western Australia. It is a sprawling, prostrate or low-lying shrub with egg-shaped or wedge-shaped leaves and yellow and reddish-brown flowers.

== Description ==
Chorizema humile is a sprawling, prostrate or low-lying shrub with branches 15–30 cm (5.9–11.8 in) long. Its leaves are leathery, egg-shaped with the narrower end towards the base, or wedge-shaped, 4–9 mm (0.16–0.35 in) long with a short, down-turned point on the end. The flowers are arranged in racemes, each flower on a short pedicel. The sepals are softly-hairy and about 6.5 mm (0.26 in) long, the upper two lobes joined for about half their length. The standard petal is twice as long as the sepals, the keel slightly longer than the sepals. Flowering occurs from July to September.

== Taxonomy ==
Chorizema humile was first formally described in 1853 by Nikolai Turczaninow in the Bulletin de la Société Impériale des Naturalistes de Moscou from specimens collected by James Drummond. The specific epithet (humile) means "low in stature".

== Distribution and habitat ==
This species of pea grows on plains in sandy clay or loam in the Avon Wheatbelt and Geraldton Sandplains bioregions of south-western Western Australia.

== Conservation status ==
Chorizema humile is listed as "Threatened" by the Western Australian Government Department of Biodiversity, Conservation and Attractions, meaning that it is in danger of extinction.
