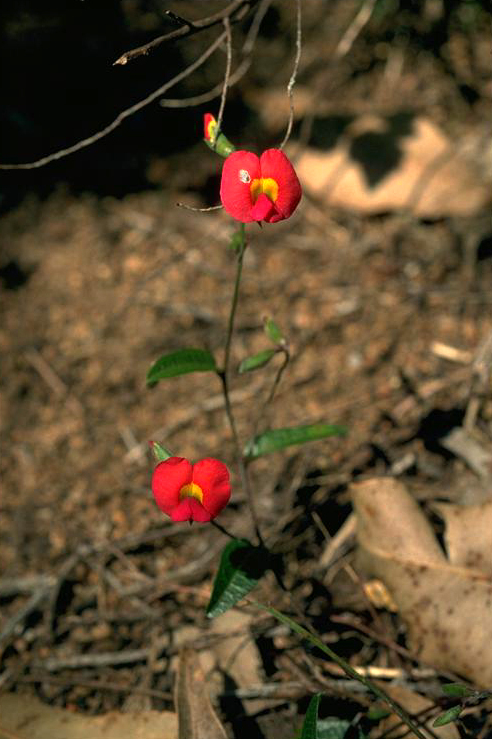
- In Porongurup National Park

Scientific classification
- Kingdom: Plantae
- Clade: Tracheophytes
- Clade: Angiosperms
- Clade: Eudicots
- Clade: Rosids
- Order: Fabales
- Family: Fabaceae
- Subfamily: Faboideae
- Genus: Chorizema
- Species: C. glycinifolium

Binomial name
- Chorizema glycinifolium (Sm.) Druce

Synonyms
- Chorisema capillipes Turcz. orth. var.; Chorizema angustifolium Benth. nom. illeg.; Chorizema capillipes Turcz.; Chorizema glycinifolium (Sm.) Domin nom. illeg.; Chorozema angustifolium Benth. orth. var.; Dillwynia glycinifolia Sm.

= Chorizema glycinifolium =

Species of legume

Chorizema glycinifolium is a species of flowering plant in the family Fabaceae and is endemic to the south-west of Western Australia. It is a slender, erect or sprawling shrub with variably-shaped leaves and orange, pink or red flowers with yellowish markings.

== Description ==
Chorizema glycinifolium is a slender, erect or sprawling shrub with branches up to 80 cm (31 in) long. The leaves are variably shaped, mostly 15–75 mm (0.59–2.95 in) long and 1–15 mm (0.039–0.591 in) wide - those near the base of the plant short and broad, and those nearer the ends of the branches long and narrow. The flowers are 10–12 mm (0.39–0.47 in) wide and orange, pink or red with yellowish markings.

== Taxonomy ==
This species of pea was first formally described in 1808 by James Edward Smith, who gave it the name Dillwynia glycinifolia in Transactions of the Linnean Society of London from specimens collected by Archibald Menzies near King George's Sound. In 1917, George Claridge Druce transferred the species to Chorizema as C. glycinifolia. The specific epithet (glycinifolium) means "Glycine-leaved".

== Distribution and habitat ==
Chorizema glycinifolium grows in sandy or gravelly soil in kwongan or in swampy places on plains and coastal areas in the Avon Wheatbelt, Esperance Plains, Jarrah Forest, Mallee, Swan Coastal Plain and Warren bioregions of south-western Western Australia. The species is listed as "not threatened" by the Western Australian Government Department of Biodiversity, Conservation and Attractions.
