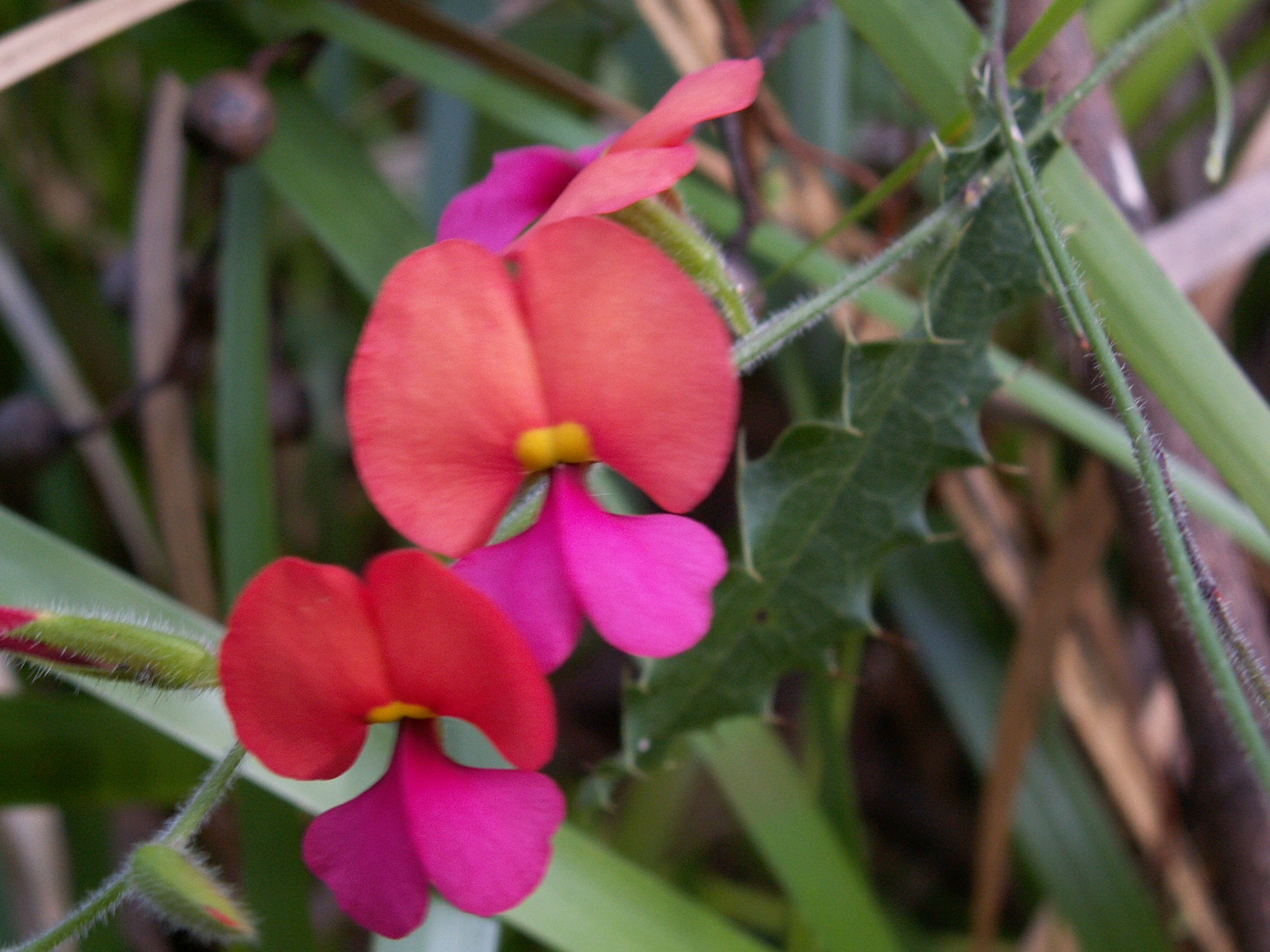
- Chorizema ilicifolium in Waychinicup National Park

Scientific classification
- Kingdom: Plantae
- Clade: Tracheophytes
- Clade: Angiosperms
- Clade: Eudicots
- Clade: Rosids
- Order: Fabales
- Family: Fabaceae
- Subfamily: Faboideae
- Genus: Chorizema
- Species: C. ilicifolium

Binomial name
- Chorizema ilicifolium Labill.

= Chorizema ilicifolium =

Species of legume

Chorizema ilicifolium, commonly known as holly flame pea, is a species of flowering plant in the family Fabaceae and is endemic to the coast of southern Western Australia. It is a slender, erect to spreading shrub with prickly, egg-shaped to lance-shaped leaves and yellowish-orange and red pea flowers.

== Description ==
Chorizema ilicifolium is a slender, erect to spreading shrub with thin branches. The leaves are glabrous, leathery, egg-shaped to lance-shaped, 19–25 mm (0.75–0.98 in) long, with prickly teeth or lobes on the edges, and often with a heart-shaped base. The flowers are yellowish-orange and red, arranged in loose groups in leaf axils or on the ends of branches. The sepals are 4–6.5 mm (0.16–0.26 in) long, the upper two curved and joined for about half their length. The standard petal is broadly kidney-shaped and twice as long as the sepals, the wings shorter than the standard, and the keel shorter than the sepals. Flowering occurs from July to October, and the fruit is an oblong pod up to 12 mm (0.47 in) long.

== Taxonomy and naming ==
Holly flame pea was first formally described in 1800 by Jacques Labillardière and the description was published in Relation du Voyage a la Recherche de la Perouse. The specific epithet (ilicifolium) means "holly-leaved".

== Distribution and habitat ==
Chorizema ilicifolium grows on sand dunes and limestone hills along the south coast of Western Australia between Busselton and Esperance in the Esperance Plains, Jarrah Forest and Warren bioregions.
