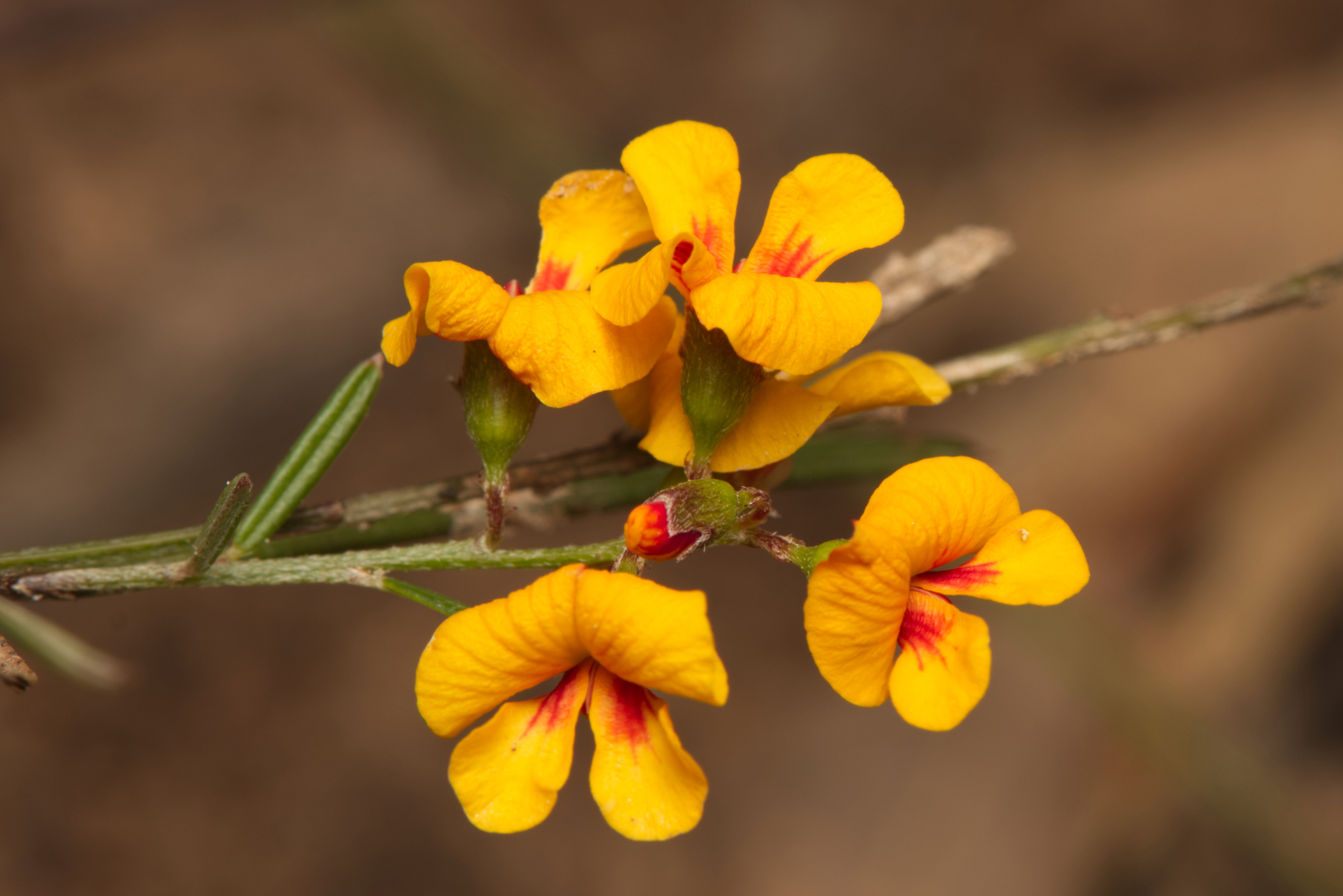
- In Maryborough, Queensland

Scientific classification
- Kingdom: Plantae
- Clade: Embryophytes
- Clade: Tracheophytes
- Clade: Spermatophytes
- Clade: Angiosperms
- Clade: Eudicots
- Clade: Rosids
- Order: Fabales
- Family: Fabaceae
- Subfamily: Faboideae
- Genus: Chorizema
- Species: C. parviflorum

Binomial name
- Chorizema parviflorum Benth.

Synonyms
- Chorozema gomphocarpum A.Gray nom. inval., nom. nud.; Chorozema parviflorum Benth. orth. var.

= Chorizema parviflorum =

Species of legume

Chorizema parviflorum, commonly known as eastern flame pea, is a species of flowering plant in the family Fabaceae and is endemic to eastern Australia. It is an erect shrub with linear to narrowly egg-shaped leaves and yellow and reddish flowers arranged in racemes on the ends of branches.

== Description ==
Chorizema parviflorum is an erect or ascending shrub that typically grows to a height of 20–50 cm (7.9–19.7 in), its branches more or less glabrous. The leaves are linear to narrowly egg-shaped with the narrower end towards the base, 20–40 mm (0.79–1.57 in) long and 1–4 mm (0.039–0.157 in) wide but often variable in size. The edges of the leaves curve downwards, the tip of the leaves is sharply pointed, and the lower surface is softly-hairy. The flowers are arranged in racemes on the ends of branches with narrowly lance-shaped bracts and bracteoles at the base. The sepals are 2–3 mm (0.079–0.118 in) long and the petals 4–7 mm (0.16–0.28 in) long and yellow with a reddish centre. Flowering occurs in spring and the fruit is a broadly oval pod 5–7 mm (0.20–0.28 in) long.

== Taxonomy ==
This chorizema was first formally described in 1837 by George Bentham in Commentationes de Leguminosarum Generibus from specimens collected by Ferdinand Bauer. The specific epithet (parviflorum) means "small-flowered".

== Distribution and habitat ==
Chorizema parviflorum mostly grows in woodland, heath or forest and is widespread but not common from south-east Queensland to the coast of New South Wales as far south as the Sydney region.
