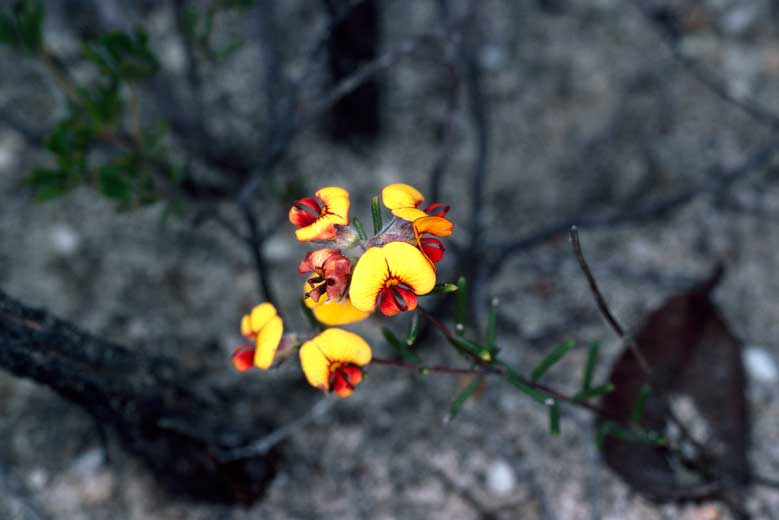
- In the Fitzgerald River National Park

Conservation status
- Priority Four — Rare Taxa (DEC)

Scientific classification
- Kingdom: Plantae
- Clade: Tracheophytes
- Clade: Angiosperms
- Clade: Eudicots
- Clade: Rosids
- Order: Fabales
- Family: Fabaceae
- Subfamily: Faboideae
- Genus: Chorizema
- Species: C. ulotropis

Binomial name
- Chorizema ulotropis J.M.Taylor & Crisp

= Chorizema ulotropis =

Species of legume

Chorizema ulotropis is a species of flowering plant in the family Fabaceae and is endemic to the southwest of Western Australia. It is a sprawling, open, more or less prostrate shrub that typically grows to a height of 45 cm (18 in) high. It has orange-yellow flowers from July to September.

It was first formally described in 1992 by Joan Taylor and Michael Crisp in the journal Australian Systematic Botany, from specimens collected near Jerramungup.

Chorizema ulotropis grows in sand with gravel or laterite on granite outcrops and flats in the Esperance Plains, Jarrah Forest and Mallee bioregions of south-western Western Australia. The specific epithet (ulotropis) means "a curled keel", referring to the woolly tips on the keeled petals.

== Conservation status ==
Chorizema ulotropis is classified as "Priority Four" by the Government of Western Australia Department of Biodiversity, Conservation and Attractions, meaning that it is rare or near threatened.
