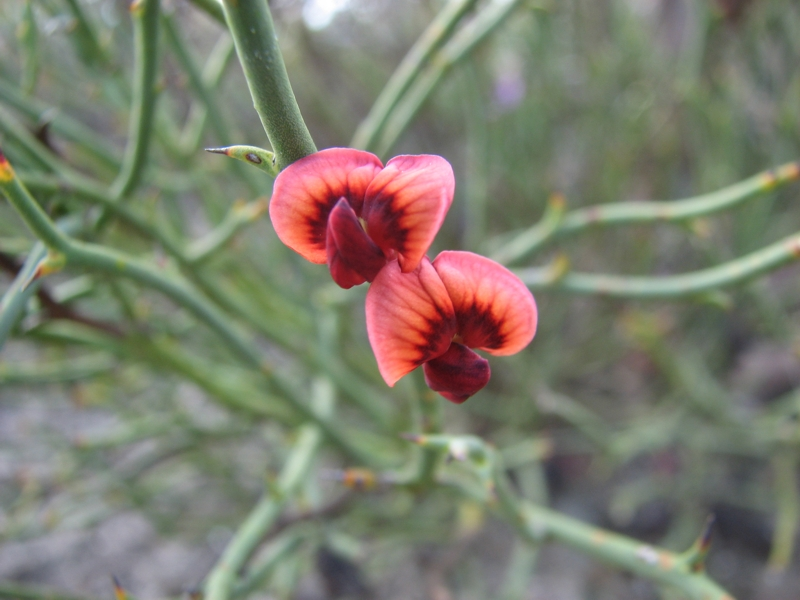
- At Anglesea Heath, Victoria

Scientific classification
- Kingdom: Plantae
- Clade: Tracheophytes
- Clade: Angiosperms
- Clade: Eudicots
- Clade: Rosids
- Order: Fabales
- Family: Fabaceae
- Subfamily: Faboideae
- Genus: Daviesia
- Species: D. brevifolia

Binomial name
- Daviesia brevifolia Lindl.

Synonyms
- Daviesia brevifolia Lindl. var. brevifolia

= Daviesia brevifolia =

Species of plant

Daviesia brevifolia, commonly known as leafless bitter-pea, is a species of flowering plant in the family Fabaceae and is endemic to the southern continental Australia. It is a broom-like shrub with short, cylindrical phyllodes and apricot to reddish-brown flowers.

== Description ==
Daviesia brevifolia is an erect, rigid, broom-like shrub that typically grows to a height of up to 1 m (3 ft 3 in) and has ascending, glabrous branchlets. Its leaves are reduced to cylindrical, sharply-pointed phyllodes 2–8 mm (0.079–0.315 in) long and 1.0–1.5 mm (0.039–0.059 in) wide at the base. The flowers are arranged in groups of three or four in leaf axils on a peduncle 1.5–2 mm (0.059–0.079 in) long with clusters of bracts about 0.5 mm (0.020 in) long at the base, each flower on a pedicel 2.0–3.5 mm (0.079–0.138 in) long. The sepals are 3–4 mm (0.12–0.16 in) long, the two upper lobes fused and the lower three triangular and about 0.5 mm (0.020 in) long. The petals are apricot to reddish-brown, the standard petal 6.5–8 mm (0.26–0.31 in) long, the wings 7.0–7.5 mm (0.28–0.30 in) long, and the keel 7.5–8.0 mm (0.30–0.31 in) long. Flowering occurs from August to October and the fruit is an inflated triangular pod 9–15 mm (0.35–0.59 in) long.

== Taxonomy ==
Daviesia brevifolia was first formally in 1838 described by John Lindley in Thomas Mitchell's journal, Three Expeditions into the interior of Eastern Australia. The specific epithet (brevifolia) is derived from the Latin words brevis meaning "short" and folium meaning "leaf".

== Distribution and habitat ==
Leafless bitter-pea grows in forest and woodland and heath in western Victoria and the south-east of South Australia.
