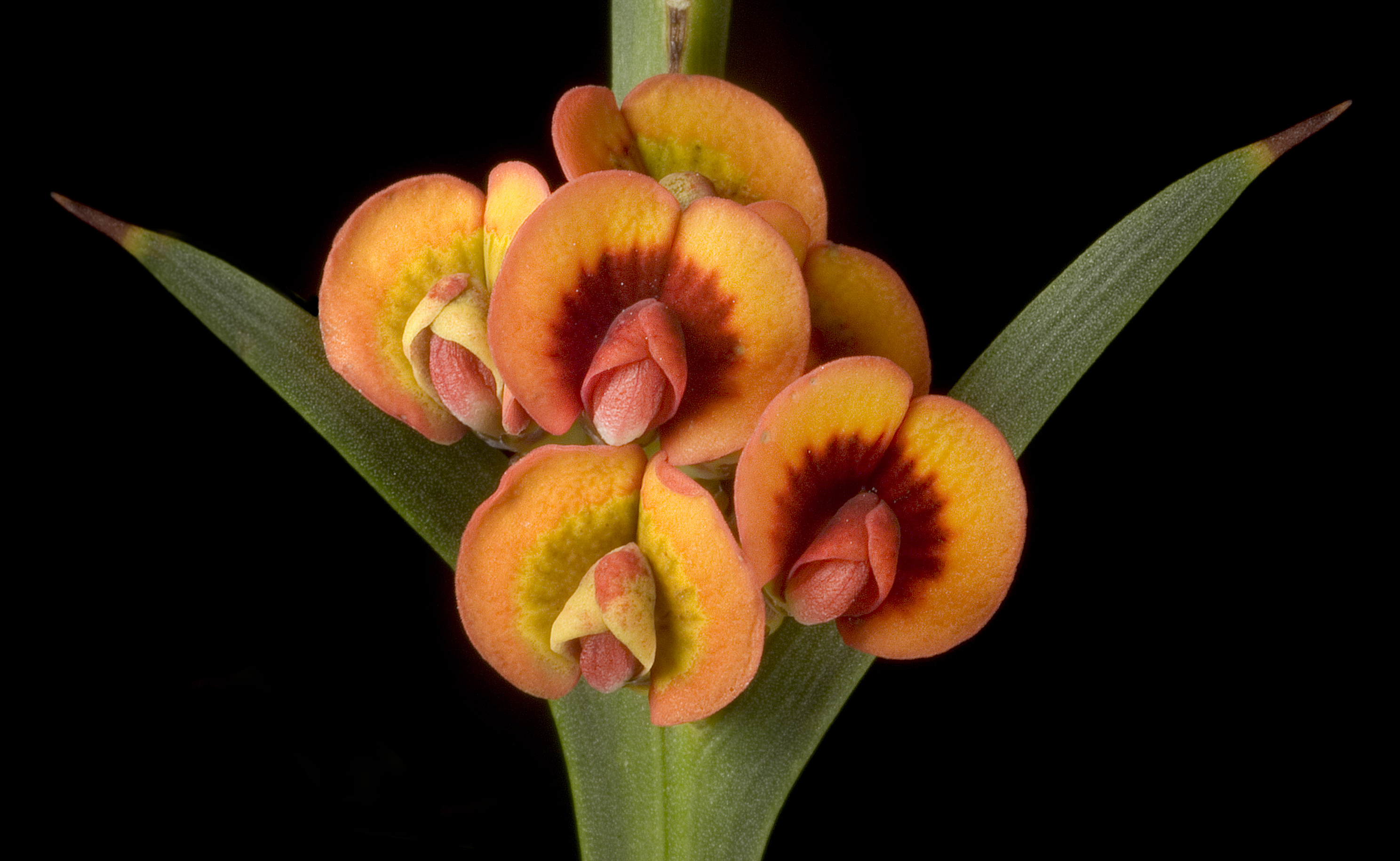
- In Wandoo Heights Nature Reserve

Scientific classification
- Kingdom: Plantae
- Clade: Tracheophytes
- Clade: Angiosperms
- Clade: Eudicots
- Clade: Rosids
- Order: Fabales
- Family: Fabaceae
- Subfamily: Faboideae
- Genus: Daviesia
- Species: D. decurrens

Binomial name
- Daviesia decurrens Meisn.

Synonyms
- Daviesia pectinata var. prionodes (Meisn.) E.Pritz.; Daviesia physodes f. gracilis Meisn.; Daviesia prionodes Meisn.

= Daviesia decurrens =

Prickly bitter-pea

Species of flowering plant

Daviesia decurrens, commonly known as prickly bitter-pea, is a species of flowering plant in the family Fabaceae and is endemic to the south-west of Western Australia. It is spreading, erect, or low-lying shrub with scattered, sharply-pointed, narrow triangular phyllodes, and yellowish pink and velvety red flowers.

== Description ==
Daviesia decurrens is a spreading, erect or low-lying, glabrous shrub that typically grows to 0.3–1.8 m (1 ft 0 in – 5 ft 11 in) high and 0.5–1.5 m (1 ft 8 in – 4 ft 11 in) wide. Its leaves are reduced to scattered, sharply-pointed, triangular to tapering, decurrent phyllodes 2–45 mm (0.079–1.772 in) long and 1–12 mm (0.039–0.472 in) wide at the base. The flowers are arranged in groups of three to seven in leaf axils on a peduncle 0.5–1.5 mm (0.020–0.059 in) long, the rachis up to 2.5 mm (0.098 in), each flower on a pedicel 0.5–2 mm (0.020–0.079 in) long with bracts about 2.5 mm (0.098 in) long. The sepals are 2.0–2.5 mm (0.079–0.098 in) long and joined at the base, the two upper lobes minute and the lower three 0.5–1.0 mm (0.020–0.039 in) long. The standard petal is elliptic or egg-shaped, 5–6 mm (0.20–0.24 in) long, 6–7 mm (0.24–0.28 in) wide and yellowish pink with a velvety red base. The wings are 4.5–7.0 mm (0.18–0.28 in) long and red, and the keel is 4.0–4.5 mm (0.16–0.18 in) long and red. Flowering mainly occurs from May to August and the fruit is an inflated, broadly triangular pod 8–13 mm (0.31–0.51 in) long.

== Taxonomy and naming ==
Daviesia decurrens was first formally described in 1844 by Carl Meissner in Lehmann's Plantae Preissianae. The specific epithet (decurrens) means "decurrent".

In 2017, Michael Crisp and Gregory T. Chandler described two subspecies in Phytotaxa, and the names are accepted by the Australian Plant Census:

- Daviesia decurrens Meisn. subsp. decurrens has strongly decurrent phyllodes up to 45 mm (1.8 in) long and up to 12 mm (0.47 in) wide;
- Daviesia decurrens subsp. hamata Crisp & G.Chandler has scarcely decurrent, cylindrical phyllodes up to 15 mm (0.59 in) long and 2 mm (0.079 in) wide.

== Distribution and habitat ==
Prickly bitter-pea grows is found from near Dongara to Busselton and eastwards to near Albany. Subspecies decurrens mostly grows in eucalypt woodland and forest, sometimes in swampland. Subspecies hamata grows in heathland and occurs further inland than subsp. decurrens, from Marchagee to Brookton and inland to near Coolgardie.

== Conservation status ==
Both subspecies of Daviesia decurrens are classified as "not threatened" by the Western Australian Government Department of Biodiversity, Conservation and Attractions.
