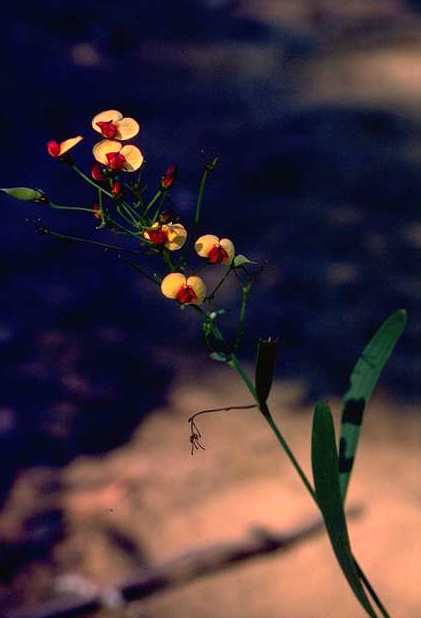
- Near Donnybrook, Western Australia

Scientific classification
- Kingdom: Plantae
- Clade: Tracheophytes
- Clade: Angiosperms
- Clade: Eudicots
- Clade: Rosids
- Order: Fabales
- Family: Fabaceae
- Subfamily: Faboideae
- Genus: Daviesia
- Species: D. costata

Binomial name
- Daviesia costata Cheel

= Daviesia costata =

Species of legume

Daviesia costata is a species of flowering plant in the family Fabaceae and is endemic to the south-west of Western Australia. It is a straggling, multi-stemmed shrub with scattered, erect, linear phyllodes, and yellow and dark red flowers.

== Description ==
Daviesia costata is a straggling, multi-stemmed, glabrous shrub that typically grows up to 0.7 m (2 ft 4 in) high and 1.3 m (4 ft 3 in) wide. Its leaves are reduced to scattered, erect, linear phyllodes 1–300 mm (0.039–11.811 in) long and 0.5–10 mm (0.020–0.394 in) wide, with a prominent mid-rib. The flowers are arranged mostly in groups of three to eight in upper leaf axils on a peduncle 20–70 mm (0.79–2.76 in) long, each flower on a pedicel 3–11 mm (0.12–0.43 in) long with sticky bracts about 1.5 mm (0.059 in) long at the base. The sepals are 3.5–5.0 mm (0.14–0.20 in) long and joined at the base with five purple-tinged lobes. The standard is yellow with a dark red base, egg-shaped, deeply notched, about 6 mm (0.24 in) long and 10 mm (0.39 in) wide. The wings and keel are dark red and about 5 mm (0.20 in) long. Flowering mainly occurs in September and October and the fruit is a flattened, triangular pod 10–15 mm (0.39–0.59 in) long.

== Taxonomy ==
Davieia costata was first formally described in 1920 by Edwin Cheel in the Journal and Proceedings of the Royal Society of Western Australia based on specimens collected by Max Koch "at Queenswood, on the Preston Valley Railway". The specific epithet (costata) mean "ribbed", referring to the stems.

== Distribution and habitat ==
This daviesia usually grows in open forest on sandy soil on flat and sloping sites between Toodyay and the Blackwood River on the Darling Range to Corrigin and Katanning, in the Avon Wheatbelt, Jarrah Forest and Swan Coastal Plain biogeographic regions of south-western Western Australia.

== Conservation status ==
Daviesia costata is listed as "not threatened" by the Department of Biodiversity, Conservation and Attractions.
