= Chorizema racemosum =

Scientific classification
- Kingdom: Plantae
- Clade: Tracheophytes
- Clade: Angiosperms
- Clade: Eudicots
- Clade: Rosids
- Order: Fabales
- Family: Fabaceae
- Subfamily: Faboideae
- Genus: Chorizema
- Species: C. racemosum

Binomial name
- Chorizema racemosum (Meisn.) J.M.Taylor & Crisp

Species of legume

Chorizema racemosum is a species of flowering plant in the family Fabaceae and is endemic to the southwest of Western Australia. It is a spreading or erect shrub with leathery, linear leaves, and yellowish-orange and red pea flowers.

== Description ==
Chorizema racemosum is a spreading or erect shrub that typically grows to a height of 0.3–2 m (1 ft 0 in – 6 ft 7 in) and has many slender, sometimes spiny branches. Its leaves are small, linear, 4.0–6.5 mm (0.16–0.26 in) long with the edges rolled under. The flowers are yellowish-orange and red, arranged in racemes 25–50 mm (0.98–1.97 in) long, each flower on a short pedicel. The sepals are silky-hairy, 4.0–6.5 mm (0.16–0.26 in) long, the two upper lobes broad and joined for most of their length. The standard petal is nearly twice as long as the sepals, the wings shorter than the standard, and the keel much shorter than the wings. Flowering occurs from May to October.

== Taxonomy and naming ==
This species was first formally described in 1844 by Carl Meissner who gave it the name Dichosema racemosum in Lehmann's Plantae Preissianae from specimens collected near Albany. In 1992, Joan M. Taylor and Michael Crisp transferred the species to Chorizema as C. racemosum in Australian Systematic Botany.

In 1848, Meissner transferred the species to Chorizema as C. ericifolium in a later edition of Plantae Preissianae, but that name was illegitimate because it has already been used for a different species by Pierre Bosserdet.

== Distribution and habitat ==
Chorizema racemosum grows on flats, undulating plains and near watercourses from Exmouth to Perth and inland as far as Meekatharra in the Avon Wheatbelt, Carnarvon, Coolgardie, Gascoyne, Geraldton Sandplains, Jarrah Forest, Murchison, Swan Coastal Plain and Yalgoo bioregions of southern Western Australia.
