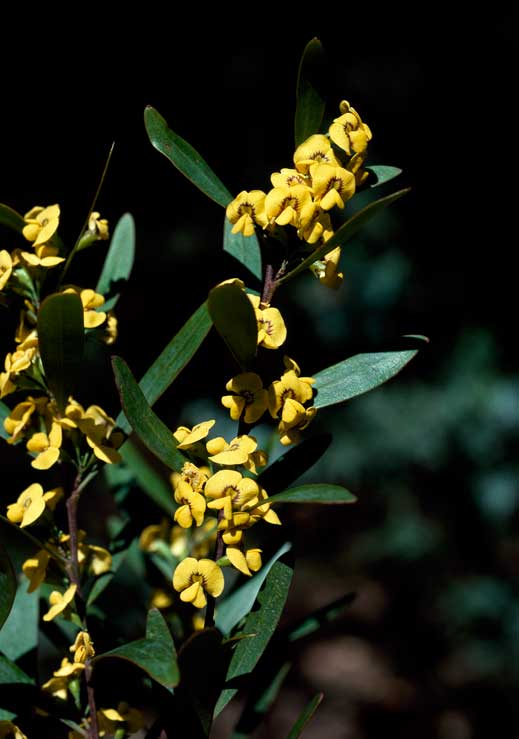
- Near Monga

Scientific classification
- Kingdom: Plantae
- Clade: Tracheophytes
- Clade: Angiosperms
- Clade: Eudicots
- Clade: Rosids
- Order: Fabales
- Family: Fabaceae
- Subfamily: Faboideae
- Genus: Daviesia
- Species: D. suaveolens

Binomial name
- Daviesia suaveolens Crisp

= Daviesia suaveolens =

Species of legume

Daviesia suaveolens is a species of flowering plant in the family Fabaceae and is endemic to south-eastern New South Wales. It is a tree-like shrub or small tree with scattered, narrowly egg-shaped phyllodes with the narrower end towards the base, and yellow flowers, sometimes with faint red markings.

== Description ==
Daviesia suaveolens is a glabrous tree-like shrub or tree that typically grows to a height of up to 6 m (20 ft). Its phyllodes are scattered, narrowly egg-shaped with the narrower end towards the base, 30–100 mm (1.2–3.9 in) long and 4–17 mm (0.16–0.67 in) wide with a tapering base. The flowers are strongly fragrant and arranged in one or two groups of three to six in leaf axils, and sessile or on a very short peduncle, the rachis 1–2 mm (0.039–0.079 in) long, each flower on a pedicel 1–3 mm (0.039–0.118 in) long. The sepals are 4–5 mm (0.16–0.20 in) long and joined at the base, the upper two lobes joined for most of their length and the lower three triangular and about 1 mm (0.039 in) long. The standard petal is broadly elliptic with a notched centre, 8–9 mm (0.31–0.35 in) long, 9–10 mm (0.35–0.39 in) wide and yellow, sometimes with faint red markings. The wings are 7–8 mm (0.28–0.31 in) long and yellow, the keel 5.5 mm (0.22 in) long and pale yellow, sometimes with a pink tinge. Flowering occurs from September to November and the fruit is a flattened, triangular pod 9–12 mm (0.35–0.47 in) long.

== Taxonomy ==
Daviesia suaveolens was first formally described in 1991 by Michael Crisp in Australian Systematic Botany from specimens he collected near Merricumbene in 1978. The specific epithet (suaveolens) means "fragrant".

== Distribution and habitat ==
This daviesia grows in forest on ridges and slopes on the escarpment between Monga and Bemboka is south-eastern New South Wales.
