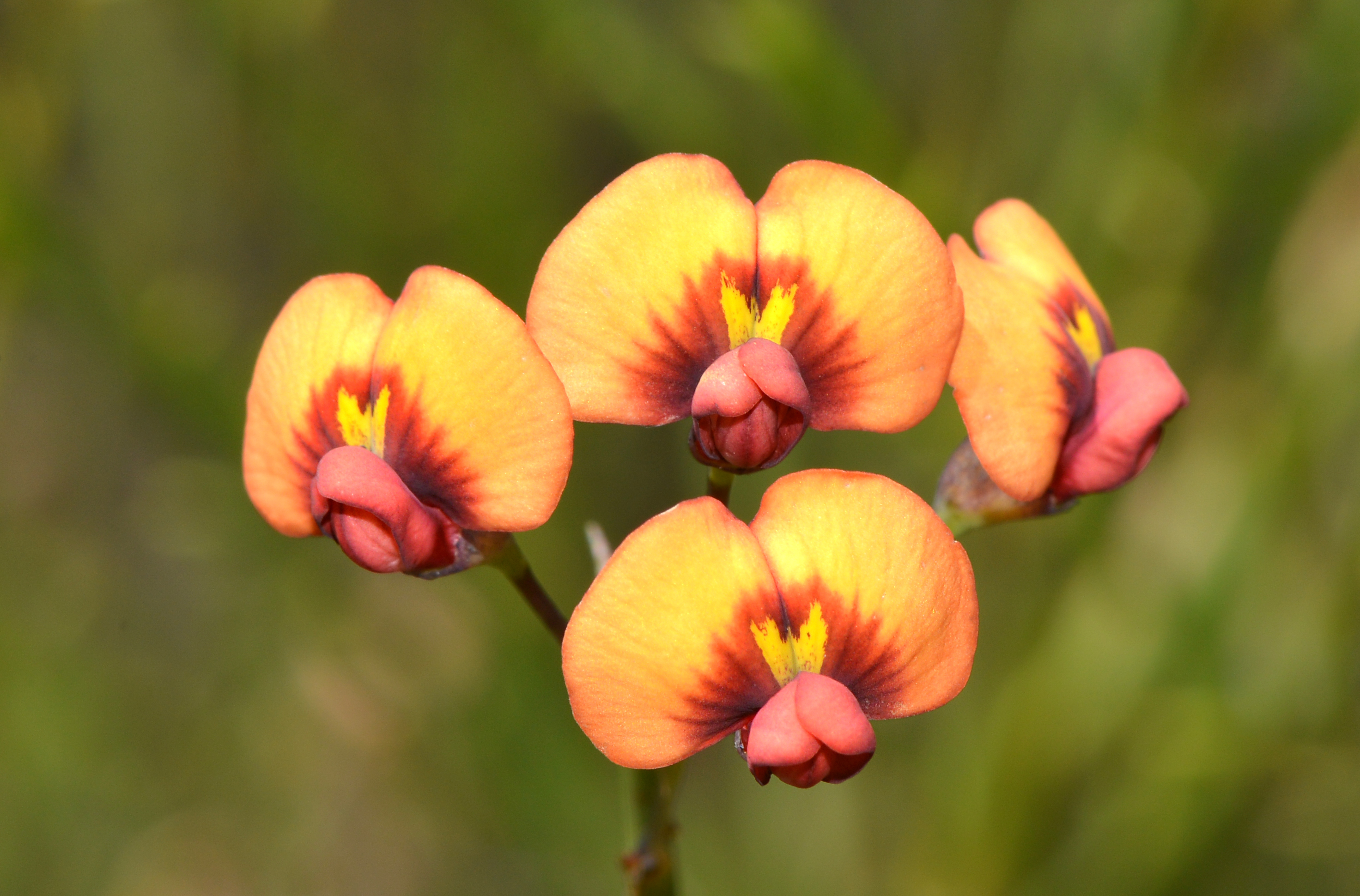
- Near Bindoon

Conservation status
- Priority One — Poorly Known Taxa (DEC)

Scientific classification
- Kingdom: Plantae
- Clade: Tracheophytes
- Clade: Angiosperms
- Clade: Eudicots
- Clade: Rosids
- Order: Fabales
- Family: Fabaceae
- Subfamily: Faboideae
- Genus: Daviesia
- Species: D. localis

Binomial name
- Daviesia localis Hislop

= Daviesia localis =

Species of flowering plant

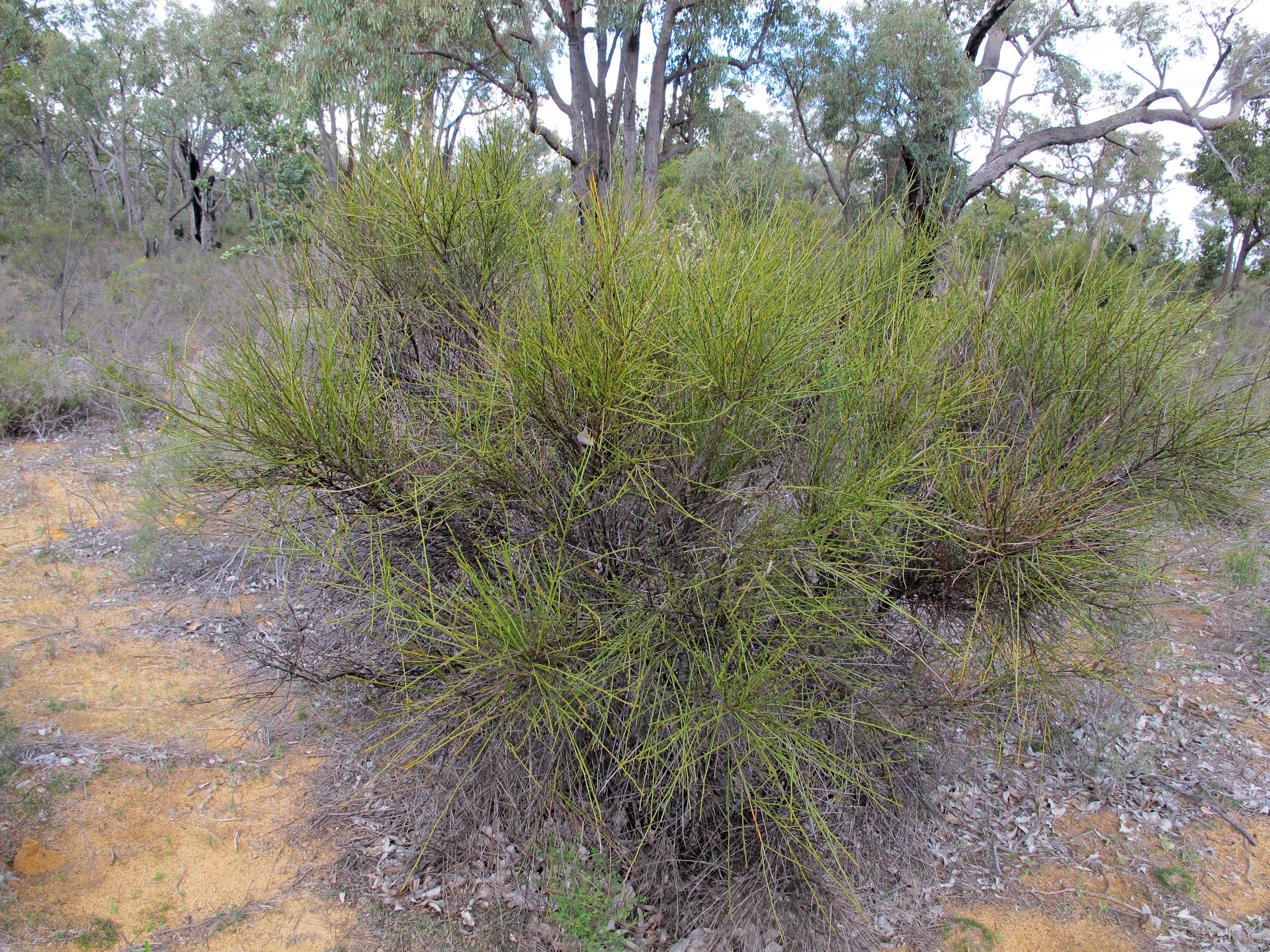
Habit

Daviesia localis is a species of flowering plant in the family Fabaceae and is endemic to a restricted area of the south-west of Western Australia. It is an erect, spreading shrub with spine-tipped branchlets, scattered, spreading, curved, needle-shaped, sharply-pointed phyllodes and orange-yellow and red flowers with a v-shaped central mark.

== Description ==
Daviesia localis is an erect, spreading shrub, typically 1.5–3 m (4 ft 11 in – 9 ft 10 in) high and about 3 m (9.8 ft) wide with divergent, spine-tipped branchlets. Its phyllodes are scattered, needle-shaped, gently curved, sharply-pointed, 2–8 mm (0.079–0.315 in) long and 0.7–1.2 mm (0.028–0.047 in) wide. The flowers are arranged in groups of four to seven in leaf axils on a peduncle 5–9 mm (0.20–0.35 in) long with oblong to narrow elliptic bracts 0.7–1.1 mm (0.028–0.043 in) long at the base, each flower on a pedicel 1.5–7 mm (0.059–0.276 in) long. The sepals are 3.8–5.2 mm (0.15–0.20 in) long and joined at the base, the upper two lobes joined for most of their length and the lower broad and less than 0.3 mm (0.012 in) long. The standard petal is egg-shaped with a deep notch at the tip, 8.5–9.5 mm (0.33–0.37 in) long and orange-yellow with a red flare and yellow, v-shaped central mark. The wings are 6.0–6.7 mm (0.24–0.26 in) long and dull red, and the keel 5.5–6.0 mm (0.22–0.24 in) long and dull red. Flowering occurs in October and November and the fruit is a triangular pod 15–18 mm (0.59–0.71 in) long.

== Taxonomy and naming ==
Daviesia localis was first formally described in 2015 by Michael Clyde Hislop in the journal Nuytsia from specimens collected north of Bindoon in 2002. The specific epithet (localis) means "local, belonging to a given place", referring to the restricted range of the species.

== Distribution and habitat ==
This daviesia grows is only known from a single population in the Bindoon area where it grows in forest.

== Conservation status ==
Daviesia localis is listed as "Priority One" by the Government of Western Australia Department of Biodiversity, Conservation and Attractions, meaning that it is known from only one or a few locations which are potentially at risk.
