= Daviesia scabrella =

Scientific classification
- Kingdom: Plantae
- Clade: Tracheophytes
- Clade: Angiosperms
- Clade: Eudicots
- Clade: Rosids
- Order: Fabales
- Family: Fabaceae
- Subfamily: Faboideae
- Genus: Daviesia
- Species: D. scabrella

Binomial name
- Daviesia scabrella Crisp

Species of legume

Daviesia scabrella is a species of flowering plant in the family Fabaceae and is endemic to inland areas of Western Australia. It is a dense, low-lying, spreading shrub with many tangled branches, scattered, sharply-pointed phyllodes, and yellow and red flowers.

== Description ==
Daviesia scabrella is a dense, low-lying, spreading shrub that typically grows up to 50 cm (20 in) high and 1–2 m (3 ft 3 in – 6 ft 7 in) wide with many tangled branches, its stems and leaves covered with minute hard points. Its phyllodes are scattered, tapering cylindrical, 5–25 mm (0.20–0.98 in) long, about 1 mm (0.039 in) wide and sharply-pointed. The flowers are arranged in one or two group of up to three in leaf axils on a peduncle 0.5–1 mm (0.020–0.039 in) long, the rachis up to 1.5 mm (0.059 in) long, each flower on a pedicel 1.0–1.8 mm (0.039–0.071 in) long. The sepals are 2.8–3.6 mm (0.11–0.14 in) long and joined at the base, the two upper lobes joined for most of their length, the lower three with lobes 0.6–1.0 mm (0.024–0.039 in) long. The standard petal is broadly egg-shaped, about 5 mm (0.20 in) long, 5.5 mm (0.22 in) wide, and yellow with a red base and a yellow centre. The wings are about 4.5 mm (0.18 in) long and yellow with a red base, the keel about 3.4 mm (0.13 in) long and dull red. Flowering has been observed in October and the fruit is a flattened, triangular pod 6–7 mm (0.24–0.28 in) long.

== Taxonomy ==
Daviesia scabrella was first formally described in 2017 by Michael Crisp in the journal Phytotaxa from specimens he collected near Condingup in 2012. The specific epithet (scabrella) means "covered with minute hard points", referring to the texture of the vegetative parts of the plant.

== Distribution and habitat ==
This daviesia grows in mallee-heath and is only known from within about 100 km (62 mi) of Condingup in the Mallee biogeographic region of inland Western Australia.

== Conservation status ==
Daviesia scabrella is listed as "not threatened" by the Government of Western Australia Department of Biodiversity, Conservation and Attractions.
