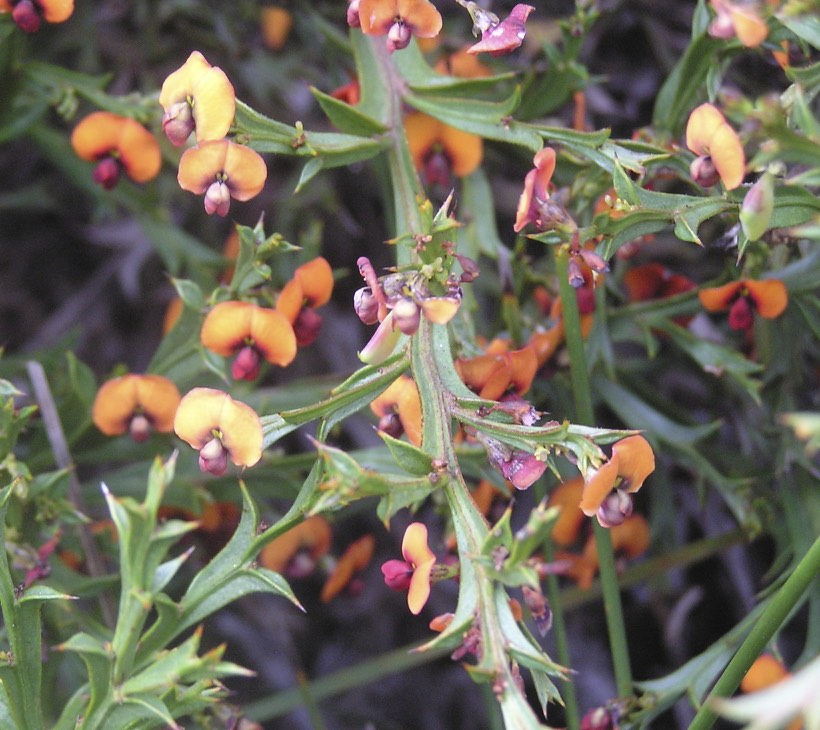
- In Hassell National Park

Scientific classification
- Kingdom: Plantae
- Clade: Tracheophytes
- Clade: Angiosperms
- Clade: Eudicots
- Clade: Rosids
- Order: Fabales
- Family: Fabaceae
- Subfamily: Faboideae
- Genus: Daviesia
- Species: D. trigonophylla

Binomial name
- Daviesia trigonophylla Meisn.

= Daviesia trigonophylla =

Species of legume

Daviesia trigonophylla is a species of flowering plant in the family Fabaceae and is endemic to the south of Western Australia. It is an erect, bushy shrub with elliptic or egg-shaped phyllodes that are triangular in cross-section, and orange, dark red and maroon flowers.

== Description ==
Daviesia trigonophylla is an erect, bushy shrub that typically grows to a height of up to 1 m (3 ft 3 in) and has winged branchlets. Its phyllodes are elliptic to egg-shaped, triangular in cross-section, 3–15 mm (0.12–0.59 in) long and 2–7 mm (0.079–0.276 in) wide and sharply-pointed. The flowers are arranged in a group of three in leaf axils on a peduncle about 0.5 mm (0.020 in) long, the rachis 0.5–2 mm (0.020–0.079 in) long, each flower on a pedicel 1.5–2.5 mm (0.059–0.098 in) long. The sepals are 3.0–3.5 mm (0.12–0.14 in) long, the two upper lobes joined for most of their length and the lower three triangular. The standard petal is elliptic with a notched tip, 5.5–8 mm (0.22–0.31 in) long, 6–9.5 mm (0.24–0.37 in) wide, and orange with a dark red base and two pale yellow spots. The wings are 5–6 mm (0.20–0.24 in) long and maroon, the keel 4–5 mm (0.16–0.20 in) long and maroon. Flowering occurs from August to October and the fruit is an inflated triangular pod 11–13 mm (0.43–0.51 in) long.

== Taxonomy ==
Daviesia trigonophylla was first formally described in 1848 by Carl Meissner in Lehmann's Plantae Preissianae. The specific epithet (trigonophylla) means "triangular-leaved", referring to the cross-sectional shape of the phyllodes.

== Distribution and habitat ==
This daviesia usually grows in mallee in the Stirling Range and nearby coastal areas in the Avon Wheatbelt, Esperance Plains and Jarrah Forest bioregions of southern Western Australia.

== Conservation status ==
Daviesia trigonophylla is classified as "not threatened" by the Government of Western Australia Department of Biodiversity, Conservation and Attractions.
