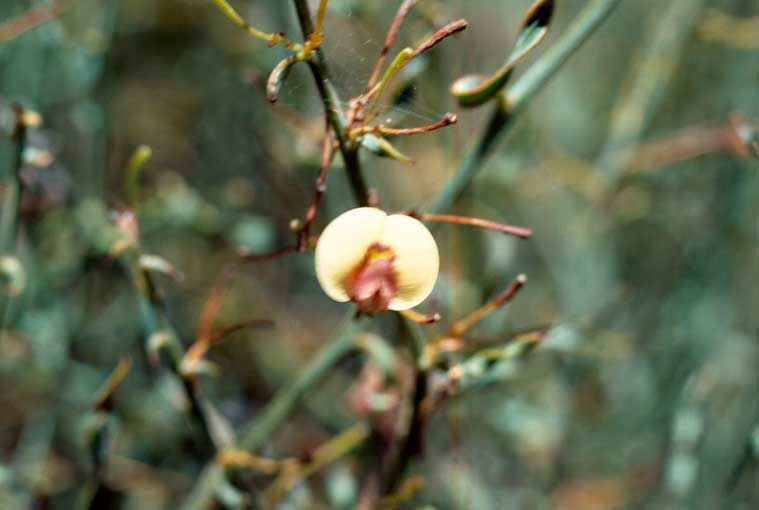
- Near Wongan Hills

Conservation status
- Priority Four — Rare Taxa (DEC)

Scientific classification
- Kingdom: Plantae
- Clade: Tracheophytes
- Clade: Angiosperms
- Clade: Eudicots
- Clade: Rosids
- Order: Fabales
- Family: Fabaceae
- Subfamily: Faboideae
- Genus: Daviesia
- Species: D. spiralis

Binomial name
- Daviesia spiralis Crisp

= Daviesia spiralis =

Species of legume

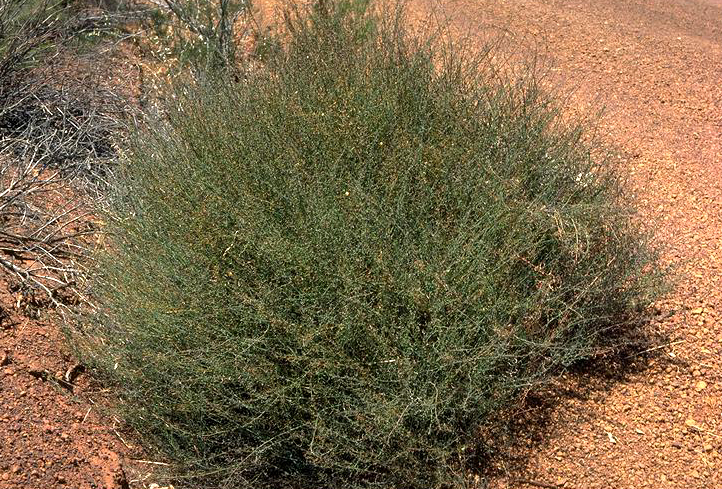
Habit

Daviesia spiralis, commonly known as spiral-leaved daviesia, is a species of flowering plant in the family Fabaceae and is endemic to a restricted area of south-western Western Australia. It is a rounded shrub with tangled branches, scattered, twisted linear phyllodes and yellow and red flowers.

== Description ==
Daviesia spiralis is a rounded shrub that typically grows to a height of 0.45–1.5 m (1 ft 6 in – 4 ft 11 in) and has many tangled branches. Its phyllodes are scattered, linear but spirally twisted, about 100 mm (3.9 in) long and 3 mm (0.12 in) wide. The flowers are arranged singly or in small groups in leaf axils on a peduncle 2–8 mm (0.079–0.315 in) long with oblong to egg-shaped bracts, each flower on a sticky pedicel 5–18 mm (0.20–0.71 in) long. The sepals are 4.0–4.5 mm (0.16–0.18 in) long and joined at the base, the upper two lobes joined for most of their length and the lower three lobes about 1.5 mm (0.059 in) long. The standard petal is broadly elliptic, 6.5–7.5 mm (0.26–0.30 in) long, 8–10 mm (0.31–0.39 in) wide and yellow with a dark red base and rich yellow centre. The wings are 7.0–7.5 mm (0.28–0.30 in) long and reddish, the keel 7.5–9 mm (0.30–0.35 in) long and reddish with a maroon tip. Flowering occurs from September to January and the fruit is a flattened, triangular pod 10–13 mm (0.39–0.51 in) long.

== Taxonomy ==
Daviesia spiralis was first formally described in 1982 by Michael Crisp in the journal Nuytsia from specimens he collected near Wongan Hills in 1979 . The specific epithet (spiralis) means "spirally coiled", referring to the leaves.

== Distribution and habitat ==
This daviesia grows in mallee-shrubland near Wongan Hills in the Avon Wheatbelt biogeographic region of south-western Western Australia.

== Conservation status ==
Daviesia spiralis is classified as "Priority Four" by the Government of Western Australia Department of Biodiversity, Conservation and Attractions, meaning that it is rare or near threatened.
