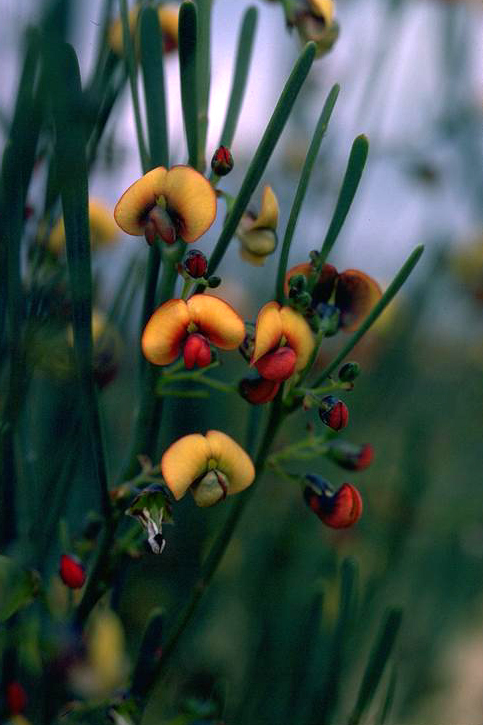
- Near Peak Charles

Scientific classification
- Kingdom: Plantae
- Clade: Tracheophytes
- Clade: Angiosperms
- Clade: Eudicots
- Clade: Rosids
- Order: Fabales
- Family: Fabaceae
- Subfamily: Faboideae
- Genus: Daviesia
- Species: D. rubiginosa

Binomial name
- Daviesia rubiginosa Crisp

= Daviesia rubiginosa =

Species of legume

Daviesia rubiginosa is a species of flowering plant in the family Fabaceae and is endemic to inland areas of south-western Western Australia. It is a broom-like, glabrous to glaucous shrub with scattered, linear to cylindrical phyllodes, and orange-yellow and red flowers.

== Description ==
Daviesia rubiginosa is a broom-like, glabrous to glaucous shrub that typically grows to a height of 0.7–2 m (2 ft 4 in – 6 ft 7 in) and has erect branchlets. Its phyllodes are scattered, linear to cylindrical with a rounded tip, 30–250 mm (1.2–9.8 in) long and 0.5–4 mm (0.020–0.157 in) wide. The flowers are arranged in groups of two to four in leaf axils on a peduncle about 1 mm (0.039 in) long, each flower on a pedicel 3–5.5 mm (0.12–0.22 in) long, the rachis 1–8 mm (0.039–0.315 in) long. The sepals are 4.0–4.5 mm (0.16–0.18 in) long and joined at the base, the five lobes all about the same length. The standard petal is elliptic, about 6–7 mm (0.24–0.28 in) long, 8–9 mm (0.31–0.35 in) wide, and orange-yellow with a red base and bright yellow centre. The wings are about 6 mm (0.24 in) long and bright red, the keel about 5 mm (0.20 in) long and very pale pink. Flowering occurs from August to October and the fruit is a flattened, triangular pod 10–12 mm (0.39–0.47 in) long.

== Taxonomy ==
Daviesia rubiginosa was first formally described in 1995 by Michael Crisp in Australian Systematic Botany from specimens collected east of Peak Charles in 1979. The specific epithet (rubiginosa) means "rust-coloured".

== Distribution and habitat ==
This daviesia grows in heath on the eastern edge of the wheatbelt in the Avon Wheatbelt, Coolgardie and Mallee biogeographic regions of south-western Western Australia.

== Conservation status ==
Daviesia rubiginosa is listed as "not threatened" by the Government of Western Australia Department of Biodiversity, Conservation and Attractions.
