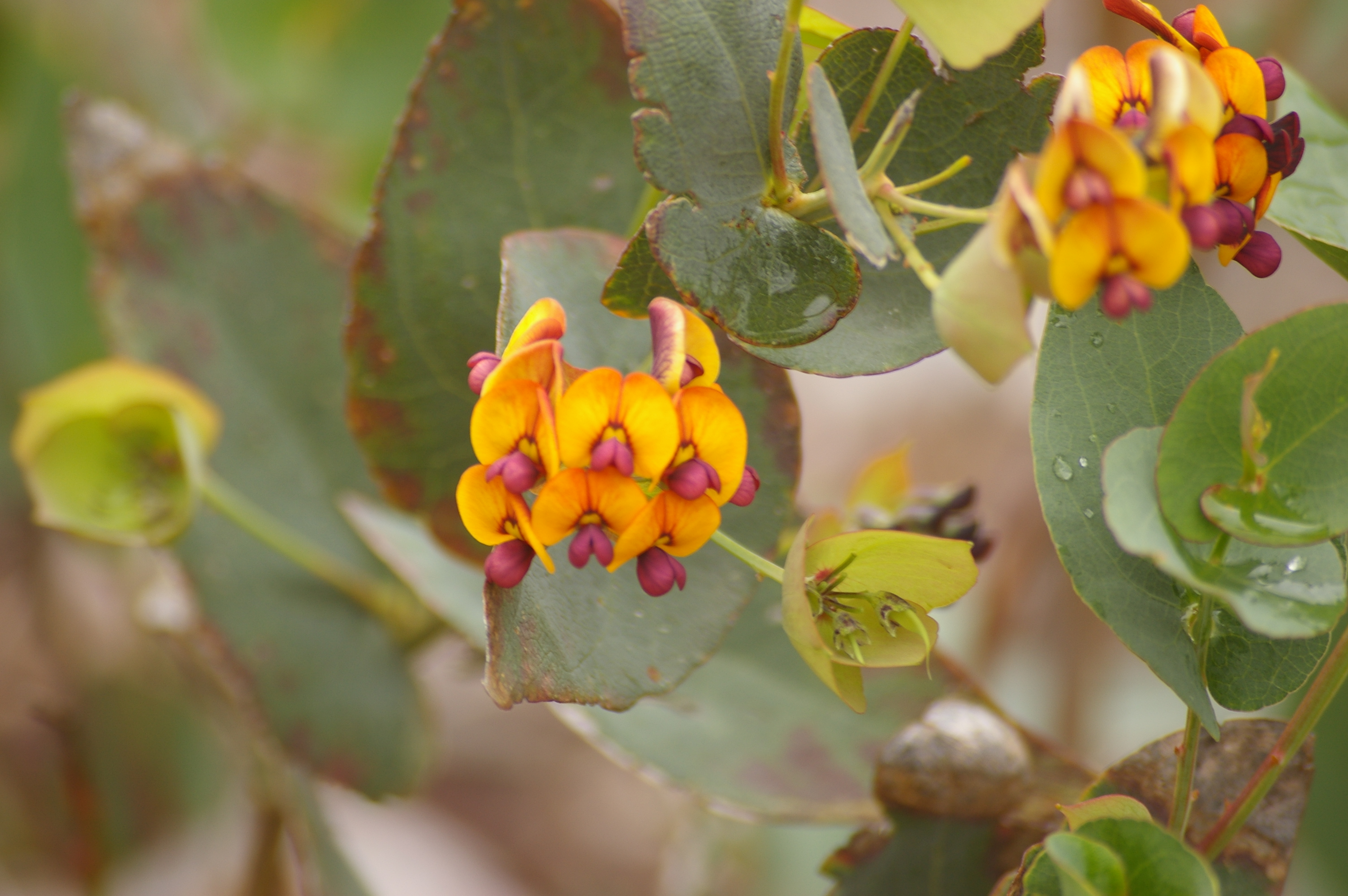
- Daviesia cordata

Scientific classification
- Kingdom: Plantae
- Clade: Tracheophytes
- Clade: Angiosperms
- Clade: Eudicots
- Clade: Rosids
- Order: Fabales
- Family: Fabaceae
- Subfamily: Faboideae
- Clade: Mirbelioids
- Genus: Daviesia; Sm.

Species
- See list

Synonyms
- List: Daviesia sect. Aphyllae (Benth.) Kuntze; Daviesia sect. Aphyllaria Kuntze orth. var.; Daviesia sect. Calamaria Kuntze orth. var.; Daviesia sect. Calamiformes (Benth.) Kuntze; Daviesia sect. Decurraria Kuntze orth. var.; Daviesia sect. Decurrentes (Benth.) Kuntze; Daviesia sect. Fascicularia Kuntze orth. var.; Daviesia sect. Fasciculatae (Benth.) Kuntze; Daviesia sect. Involucraria Kuntze orth. var.; Daviesia sect. Involucratae (Benth.) Kuntze; Daviesia sect. Racemaria Kuntze orth. var.; Daviesia sect. Racemosae (Benth.) Kuntze; Daviesia sect. Teretiaria Kuntze orth. var.; Daviesia sect. Teretifoliae (Benth.) Kuntze; Daviesia sect. Umbellaria Kuntze orth. var.; Daviesia sect. Umbellata (Benth.) Kuntze; Daviesia sect. Verticales (Benth.) Kuntze; Daviesia sect. Verticaria Kuntze orth. var.; Daviesia ser. Aphyllae Benth.; Daviesia ser. Calamiformes Benth.; Daviesia ser. Decurrentes Benth.; Daviesia ser. Fasciculatae Benth.; Daviesia ser. Involucratae Benth.; Daviesia ser. Racemosae Benth.; Daviesia ser. Teretifoliae (Benth.) Benth.; Daviesia ser. Umbellatae Benth.; Daviesia ser. Verticales Benth.; Daviesia § Teretifoliae Benth.

= Daviesia =

Bitter peas

Genus of plants

Daviesia, commonly known as bitter peas, is a genus of about 130 species of flowering plants in the family Fabaceae, and is endemic to Australia. Plants in the genus Daviesia are shrubs or small trees with leaves modified as phyllodes or reduced to scales. The flowers are arranged singly or in groups, usually in leaf axils, the sepals joined at the base with five teeth, the petals usually yellowish with reddish markings and the fruit a pod.

== Description ==
Plants in the genus Daviesia are shrubs or small trees with their leaves modified as phyllodes that are often sharply-pointed, or have leaves reduced to scales with the stems modified as cladodes. The flowers are usually arranged in leaf axils, either singly or in clusters or racemes with bracts sometimes present on the peduncles, pedicels or flowering stems. The sepals are joined at the base to form a bell-shaped tube with five teeth, the two upper teeth usually wider and the petals are usually yellowish with reddish markings, the standard petal more or less round with a notch at the top and often shorter than the wings and keel. The fruit is a more or less flattened pod containing one or two seeds, each with an aril on the end.

The roots of many Daviesia species have a mode of secondary thickening in which successive arch-like cambia arise outside the roots of the previous season, creating rope-like structures on the roots. Like other genera in their family, Daviesia species have nitrogen-fixing bacteria contained in root nodules.

== Taxonomy ==
The genus Daviesia was first formally described in 1798 by James Edward Smith in Transactions of the Linnean Society of London. The genus is named in honour of Hugh Davies, a Welsh botanist.

== Distribution ==
Species of Daviesia are found in all states and mainland territories of Australia, but the majority occur in Western Australia.

=== Species list ===
The following is a list of Daviesia species accepted by the Australian Plant Census as of October 2021:

- Daviesia abnormis F.Muell. (W.A.)
- Daviesia acicularis Sm. – sharp bitter-pea (N.S.W., Qld., A.C.T.)
- Daviesia alata Sm. (N.S.W.)
- Daviesia alternifolia Endl. (W.A.)
- Daviesia anceps Turcz. (W.A.)
- Daviesia angulata Benth. (W.A.)
- Daviesia aphylla F.Muell. ex Benth. (W.A., S.A.)
- Daviesia apiculata Crisp (W.A.)
- Daviesia arborea W.Hill – golden pea, bitterleaf pea (Qld., N.S.W.)
- Daviesia arenaria Crisp – sandhill bitter-pea (S.A., N.S.W., Vic.)
- Daviesia argillacea Crisp (W.A.)
- Daviesia arthropoda F.Muell. (W.A., N.T., S.A., Qld.)
- Daviesia articulata Crisp (W.A.)
- Daviesia asperula Crisp (S.A.)
  - Daviesia asperula Crisp subsp. asperula
  - Daviesia asperula subsp. obliqua Crisp
- Daviesia audax Crisp (W.A.)
- Daviesia benthamii Meisn. (W.A.)
- Daviesia brachyphylla Meisn. (W.A.
- Daviesia brevifolia Lindl. – leafless bitter-pea (S.A., Vic.)
- Daviesia bursarioides Crisp – Three Springs daviesia (W.A.)
- Daviesia buxifolia Benth. – box-leaf bitter-pea (N.S.W., Vic.)
- Daviesia campephylla Crisp (W.A.)
- Daviesia cardiophylla F.Muell. (W.A.)
- Daviesia chapmanii Crisp (W.A.)
- Daviesia cordata Sm. – bookleaf (W.A.)
- Daviesia corymbosa Sm. – narrow leaf bitter-pea (N.S.W.)
- Daviesia costata Cheel (W.A.)
- Daviesia crassa Crisp (W.A.)
- Daviesia crenulata Turcz. (W.A.)
- Daviesia croniniana F.Muell. (W.A.)
- Daviesia cunderdin Crisp & G.Chandler – Cunderdin daviesia (W.A.)
- Daviesia daphnoides Meisn. (W.A.)
- Daviesia debilior Crisp (W.A.)
  - Daviesia debilior Crisp subsp. debilior (W.A.)
  - Daviesia debilior subsp. sinuans Crisp (W.A.)
- Daviesia decipiens (E.Pritz.) Crisp (W.A.)
- Daviesia decurrens Meisn. – prickly bitter-pea (W.A.)
  - Daviesia decurrens Meisn. subsp. decurrens (W.A.)
  - Daviesia decurrens subsp. hamata (Crisp) Crisp & G.Chandler (W.A.)
- Daviesia devito Crisp & L.G.Cook (S.A., N.S.W., Vic.)
- Daviesia dielsii E.Pritz. – Diels' daviesia (W.A.)
- Daviesia dilatata Crisp (W.A.)
- Daviesia discolor Pedley (Qld.)
- Daviesia divaricata Benth. – marno (W.A.)
  - Daviesia divaricata Benth. subsp. divaricata (W.A.)
  - Daviesia divaricata subsp. lanulosa Crisp & G.Chandler (W.A.)
- Daviesia elliptica Crisp – wild hops (Qld., N.S.W.)
- Daviesia elliptica Crisp × Daviesia mimosoides R.Br. subsp. mimosoides (Qld.)
- Daviesia elongata Benth. (W.A.)
  - Daviesia elongata Benth. subsp. elongata (W.A.)
- Daviesia emarginata (Miq.) Crisp (W.A.)
- Daviesia epiphyllum Meisn. – staghorn bush (W.A.)
- Daviesia eremaea Crisp (W.A., N.T.)
- Daviesia euphorbioides Benth. (W.A.) – Wongan cactus
- Daviesia eurylobos Crisp & G.Chandler (W.A.)
- Daviesia filipes Benth. (Qld.)
  - Daviesia filipes Benth. subsp. filipes (Qld.)
  - Daviesia filipes subsp. terminalis Crisp & G.Chandler (Qld.)
- Daviesia flava Pedley (Qld.)
- Daviesia flexuosa Benth. (W.A.)
- Daviesia genistifolia A.Cunn. ex Benth. – broom bitter-pea (S.A., Qld., N.S.W., A.C.T., Vic.)
- Daviesia glossosema Crisp – maroon-flowered daviesia (W.A.)
- Daviesia gracilis Crisp (W.A.)
- Daviesia grahamii Ewart & Jean White (W.A.)
- Daviesia grossa Crisp (W.A.)
- Daviesia hakeoides Meisn. (W.A.)
  - Daviesia hakeoides Meisn. subsp. hakeoides
  - Daviseia hakeoides subsp. subnuda Crisp
- Daviesia horrida Preiss ex Meisn. – prickly bitter-pea (W.A.)
- Daviesia implexa (Crisp) Crisp (W.A.)
- Daviesia incrassata Sm. (W.A.)
  - Daviesia incrassata Sm. subsp. incrassata
  - Daviesia incrassata subsp. reversifolia (F.Muell.) Crisp
  - Daviesia incrassata subsp. teres Crisp
- Daviesia inflata Crisp (W.A.)
- Daviesia intricata Crisp (W.A.)
  - Daviesia intricata Crisp subsp. intricata
  - Daviesia intricata subsp. xiphophylla Crisp
- Daviesia laevis Crisp (Vic.)
- Daviesia lancifolia Turcz. (W.A)
- Daviesia latifolia R.Br. – hop bitter-pea (Qld., N.S.W., Vic., Tas.)
- Daviesia laxiflora (J.H.Willis) Crisp (Vic.)
- Daviesia leptophylla A.Cunn. ex G.Don – narrow-leaf bitter-pea (S.A., N.S.W., A.C.T., Vic.)
- Daviesia lineata Crisp (W.A.)
- Daviesia localis Hislop (W.A.)
- Daviesia longifolia Benth. (W.A.)
- Daviesia major (Benth.) Crisp (W.A.)
- Daviesia megacalyx Crisp (W.A.)
- Daviesia mesophylla Ewart (W.A.)
- Daviesia microcarpa Crisp – Norseman pea (W.A.)
- Daviesia microphylla Benth. (W.A.)
- Daviesia mimosoides R.Br. – blunt-leaf bitter-pea, narrow-leaf bitter pea, leafy bitter-pea (Qld., N.S.W., A.C.T., Vic.)
  - Daviesia mimosoides subsp. acris Crisp (N.S.W., A.C.T., Vic.)
  - Daviesia mimosoides R.Br. subsp. mimosoides (Qld., N.S.W., A.C.T., Vic.)
- Daviesia mollis Turcz. (W.A.)
- Daviesia nematophylla F.Muell. ex Benth. (W.A.)
- Daviesia newbeyi Crisp (W.A.)
- Daviesia nova-anglica Crisp (N.S.W.)
- Daviesia nudiflora Meisn. (W.A.)
  - Daviesia nudiflora subsp. amplectens Crisp
  - Daviesia nudiflora subsp. drummondii (Meisn.) Crisp
  - Daviesia nudiflora subsp. hirtella Crisp
  - Daviesia nudiflora Meisn. subsp. nudiflora
- Daviesia obovata Turcz. – paddle-leaf daviesia (W.A.)
- Daviesia oppositifolia Endl. – rattle-pea (W.A.)
- Daviesia ovata Benth. – broad-leaf daviesia (W.A.)
- Daviesia oxyclada Crisp (W.A.)
- Daviesia oxylobium Crisp (W.A.)
- Daviesia pachyloma Turcz. (W.A.)
- Daviesia pachyphylla F.Muell. – ouch bush (W.A.)
- Daviesia pauciflora Crisp (W.A.)
- Daviesia pectinata Lindl. – thorny bitter-pea (S.A., Vic.)
- Daviesia pedunculata Benth. ex Lindl. (W.A.)
- Daviesia physodes A.Cunn. ex G.Don (W.A.)
- Daviesia pleurophylla Crisp (W.A.)
- Daviesia podophylla Crisp – buggery bush (W.A.)
- Daviesia polyphylla Benth. (W.A.)
- Daviesia preissii Meisn. (W.A.)
- Daviesia pseudaphylla Crisp – Stirling Range daviesia (W.A.)
- Daviesia pteroclada Crisp (W.A.)
- Daviesia pubigera A.Cunn. ex Benth. (N.S.W.)
- Daviesia purpurascens Crisp – purple-leaved daviesia (W.A.)
- Daviesia quadrilatera Benth. – buggery bush (W.A.)
- Daviesia quoquoversus Crisp (Qld.)
- Daviesia ramosissima Crisp (W.A.)
- Daviesia reclinata A.Cunn. ex Benth. (W.A.)
- Daviesia retrorsa Crisp (W.A.)
- Daviesia rhizomata Crisp (W.A.)
- Daviesia rhombifolia Meisn. (W.A.)
- Daviesia rubiginosa Crisp (W.A.)
- Daviesia sarissa Crisp (W.A.)
  - Daviesia sarissa subsp. redacta Crisp
  - Daviesia sarissa Crisp subsp. sarissa Crisp
- Daviesia scoparia Crisp (W.A.)
- Daviesia sarissa Crisp (W.A.)
- Daviesia scabrella Crisp (W.A.)
- Daviesia schwarzenegger Crisp & L.G.Cook (N.S.W., Vic., S.A.)
- Daviesia scoparia Crisp (W.A.)
- Daviesia sejugata G. Chandler & Crisp (S.A., Tas.)
- Daviesia smithiorum Crisp (W.A.)
- Daviesia sp. Calliope (N.Gibson TOI308) Qld Herbarium (Qld.)
- Daviesia speciosa Crisp (W.A.)
- Daviesia spinosissima Meisn. (W.A.)
- Daviesia spiralis Crisp – spiral-leaved daviesia (W.A.)
- Daviesia sp. Isla Gorge (K.R.McDonald KRM231) Qld Herbarium (Qld.)
- Daviesia squarrosa Sm. (Qld., N.S.W.)
- Daviesia striata Turcz. (W.A.)
- Daviesia stricta Crisp (S.A.)
- Daviesia suaveolens Crisp (N.S.W.)
- Daviesia subulata Crisp & G.Chandler (W.A.)
- Daviesia teretifolia R.Br. ex Benth. (W.A.)
- Daviesia tortuosa Crisp (W.A.)
- Daviesia triflora Crisp (W.A.)
- Daviesia trigonophylla Meisn. (W.A.)
- Daviesia ulicifolia Andrews – gorse bitter-pea (W.A., S.A., Qld., N.S.W., A.C.T., Tas.)
  - Daviesia ulicifolia subsp. aridicola G.Chandler & Crisp
  - Daviesia ulicifolia subsp. Bybera (C.T.White 12612) Qld Herbarium (Qld.)
  - Daviesia ulicifolia subsp. incarnata G.Chandler & Crisp (S.A.)
  - Daviesia ulicifolia subsp. pilligensis G.Chandler & Crisp (N.S.W.)
  - Daviesia ulicifolia subsp. ruscifolia (A.Cunn. ex Benth.) G.Chandler & Crisp (N.S.W., A.C.T., Vic., Tas.)
  - Daviesia ulicifolia subsp. stenophylla G.Chandler & Crisp (Qld., N.S.W.)
  - Daviesia ulicifolia subsp. stenophylla G.Chandler & Crisp × Daviesia wyattiana F.M.Bailey (Qld.)
  - Daviesia ulicifolia Andrews subsp. ulicifolia (S.A., Qld., N.S.W., Vic., Tas.)
  - Daviesia ulicifolia subsp. Warwick (K.R.McDonald KRM107) Qld Herbarium (Qld.)
- Daviesia umbellulata Sm. (Qld., N.S.W.)
- Daviesia umbonata G. Chandler & Crisp (W.A.)
- Daviesia uncinata Crisp (W.A.)
- Daviesia uniflora D.A.Herb. (W.A.)
- Daviesia villifera A.Cunn. ex Benth. (Qld., N.S.W.)
- Daviesia wyattiana F.M.Bailey – long-leaf bitter-pea (Qld., N.S.W., Vic.)
