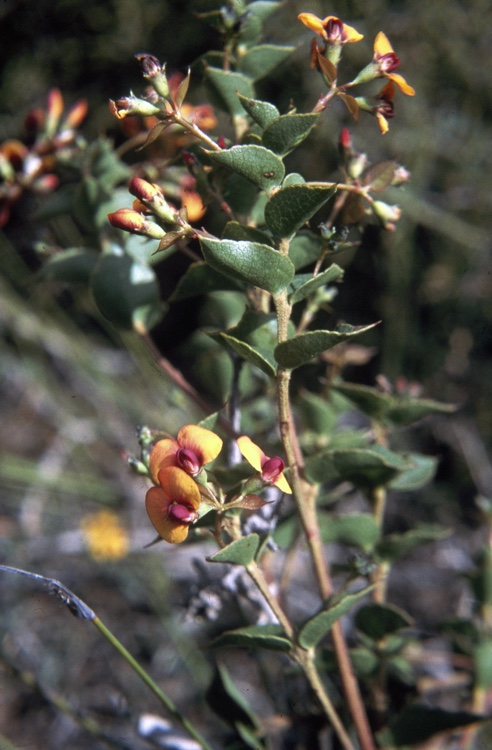
- In the Stirling Range

Scientific classification
- Kingdom: Plantae
- Clade: Tracheophytes
- Clade: Angiosperms
- Clade: Eudicots
- Clade: Rosids
- Order: Fabales
- Family: Fabaceae
- Subfamily: Faboideae
- Genus: Daviesia
- Species: D. crenulata

Binomial name
- Daviesia crenulata Turcz.

= Daviesia crenulata =

Species of flowering plant

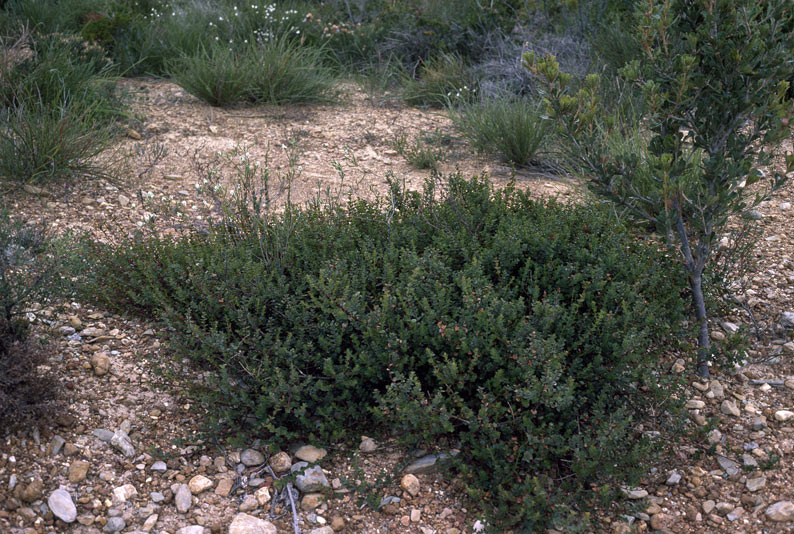
Habit

Daviesia crenulata is a species of flowering plant in the family Fabaceae and is endemic to the south-west of Western Australia. It is a bushy shrub with broadly egg-shaped phyllodes with a sharply-pointed end and wavy edges, and uniformly yellow-orange and maroon flowers.

== Description ==
Daviesia crenulata is a bushy shrub that typically grows to a height of 15 cm (5.9 in) to 8 m (26 ft) and has hairy, ridged branchlets. Its leaves are reduced to scattered, spreading, broadly egg-shaped phyllodes 15–31 mm (0.59–1.22 in) long and 14–35 mm (0.55–1.38 in) wide. The phyllodes have a sharply-pointed tip on the end, a heart-shaped base and wavy edges. The flowers are mostly arranged in groups of two to four in leaf axils on a peduncle 17–55 mm (0.67–2.17 in) long, each flower on a pedicel 2.5–3.5 mm (0.098–0.138 in) long with oblong bracts about 1 mm (0.039 in) long at the base. The sepals are 4.5–5.5 mm (0.18–0.22 in) long and joined at the base, the two upper lobes joined for most of their length and the lower three triangular and about 1 mm (0.039 in) long. The standard is elliptic, yellow-orange with maroon markings, 7.0–8.5 mm (0.28–0.33 in) long and 10.0–11.5 mm (0.39–0.45 in) wide, the wings elliptic, maroon and 6.0–6.5 mm (0.24–0.26 in) long and the keel about 5.5 mm (0.22 in) long. Flowering occurs in September and October and the fruit is a flattened, triangular pod 10–11 mm (0.39–0.43 in) long.

== Taxonomy and naming ==
Daviesia crenulata was first formally described in 1853 by Nikolai Turczaninow in the Bulletin de la Société Impériale des Naturalistes de Moscou. The specific epithet (crenulata) means "crenulate", referring to the edge of the phyllodes.

== Distribution and habitat ==
This species of pea grows in heath, mallee-heath and forest and mainly occurs in the Stirling Range in the Avon Wheatbelt, Esperance Plains and Mallee biogeographic regions of south-western Western Australia.

== Conservation status ==
Daviesia crenulata is classified as "not threatened" by the Government of Western Australia Department of Biodiversity, Conservation and Attractions.
