= Daviesia newbeyi =

Conservation status
- Priority Three — Poorly Known Taxa (DEC)

Scientific classification
- Kingdom: Plantae
- Clade: Tracheophytes
- Clade: Angiosperms
- Clade: Eudicots
- Clade: Rosids
- Order: Fabales
- Family: Fabaceae
- Subfamily: Faboideae
- Genus: Daviesia
- Species: D. newbeyi

Binomial name
- Daviesia newbeyi Crisp

Species of flowering plant

Daviesia newbeyi is a species of flowering plant in the family Fabaceae and is endemic to the south-west of Western Australia. It is a bushy, broom-like, more or less glabrous shrub with ridged stems, narrowly oblong to linear phyllodes, and orange flowers with dark red markings.

== Description ==
Daviesia newbeyi is a bushy, broom-like shrub that typically grows to a height of up to 0.2–1.5 m (7.9 in – 4 ft 11.1 in) and has many ridged stems at its base. Its phyllodes are somewhat crowded, narrowly oblong to linear, 5–40 mm (0.20–1.57 in) long, 1.5–3.5 mm (0.059–0.138 in) wide and rigid. The flowers are arranged singly in leaf axils on a peduncle 0.75–4.0 mm (0.030–0.157 in) long, the pedicel 2–5 mm (0.079–0.197 in) long with narrowly oblong bracts 0.75–4 mm (0.030–0.157 in) long at the base. The sepals are 4.75–5.5 mm (0.187–0.217 in) long and joined at the base, the two upper lobes joined for most of their length and the lower three broadly triangular and about 1 mm (0.039 in) long. The standard petal is egg-shaped, about 7.5–8.0 mm (0.30–0.31 in) long and wide, and orange with dark red markings around a central yellow spot. The wings are about 6 mm (0.24 in) long and dark red, and the keel is about 5 mm (0.20 in) long and dark red. Flowering mostly occurs from August to early October and the fruit is a flattened triangular pod 9–11 mm (0.35–0.43 in) long.

== Taxonomy and naming ==
Daviesia newbeyi was first formally described in 1991 by Michael Crisp in Australian Systematic Botany from specimens collected by Kenneth Newbey near Ravensthorpe in 1978. The specific epithet (newbeyi) honours the collector of the type specimens.

== Distribution and habitat ==
This daviesia grows in heath and is known from a few disjunct populations, near Ravensthorpe, Lake Grace, Coolgardie and Esperance, in the Esperance Plains and Mallee biogeographic region of inland Western Australia.

== Conservation status ==
Daviesia newbeyi is listed as "Priority Three" by the Government of Western Australia Department of Biodiversity, Conservation and Attractions, meaning that it is poorly known and known from only a few locations but is not under imminent threat.
