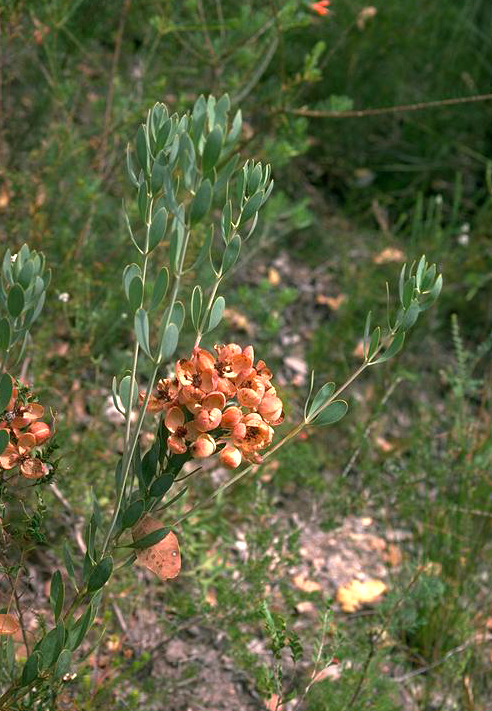
- Daviesia oppositifolia in the Stirling Range

Scientific classification
- Kingdom: Plantae
- Clade: Tracheophytes
- Clade: Angiosperms
- Clade: Eudicots
- Clade: Rosids
- Order: Fabales
- Family: Fabaceae
- Subfamily: Faboideae
- Genus: Daviesia
- Species: D. oppositifolia

Binomial name
- Daviesia oppositifolia Endl.

= Daviesia oppositifolia =

Rattle-pea

Species of legume

Daviesia oppositifolia, commonly known as rattle-pea, is a species of flowering plant in the family Fabaceae and is endemic to the south-west of Western Australia. It is an erect shrub with many stems, egg-shaped phyllodes with the narrower end towards the base, and yellow flowers with maroon markings.

== Description ==
Daviesia oppositifolia is an erect shrub that typically grows to a height of 0.5–2 m (1 ft 8 in – 6 ft 7 in) and has many stems. Its phyllodes are often arranged in opposite pairs, egg-shaped with the narrower end towards the base, mostly 37–122 mm (1.5–4.8 in) long and 11–37 mm (0.43–1.46 in) wide. The flowers are arranged in leaf axils in one or two groups of five to ten flowers surrounded by three large involucral bracts, green at first, later deep copper-maroon. The groups are on a peduncle 28–43 mm (1.1–1.7 in) long, the rachis 2.0–2.5 mm (0.079–0.098 in) long, each flower on a pedicel 3.5–6 mm (0.14–0.24 in) long with bracts about 1.5 mm (0.059 in) long at the base. The sepals are 4–5 mm (0.16–0.20 in) long and joined at the base, the upper two lobes about 1 mm (0.039 in) long and the lower three 0.5 mm (0.020 in) long. The standard petal is elliptic with a notched tip, about 6 mm (0.24 in) long, 5.5–6.0 mm (0.22–0.24 in) wide, and yellow with a maroon base around a yellow centre. The wings are 5.0–5.5 mm (0.20–0.22 in) long and maroon with yellow tips, and the keel is 4.5–5.5 mm (0.18–0.22 in) long and maroon. Flowering occurs from March to November and the fruit is a flattened triangular pod 9–11 mm (0.35–0.43 in) long.

== Taxonomy ==
Daviesia oppositifolia was first described in 1838 by Stephan Endlicher in the journal Annalen des Wiener Museums der Naturgeschichte from specimens collected near King George Sound. The specific epithet (oppositifolia) means "opposite-leaved".

== Distribution and habitat ==
Rattle-pea grows in forest with Eucalyptus species and mainly occurs in the Stirling Range but is also found near Denmark and Cheyne Beach, in the Esperance Plains and Jarrah Forest biogeographic regions of south-western Western Australia.

== Conservation status ==
This daviesia is listed as "not threatened" by the Western Australian Government Department of Parks and Wildlife.
