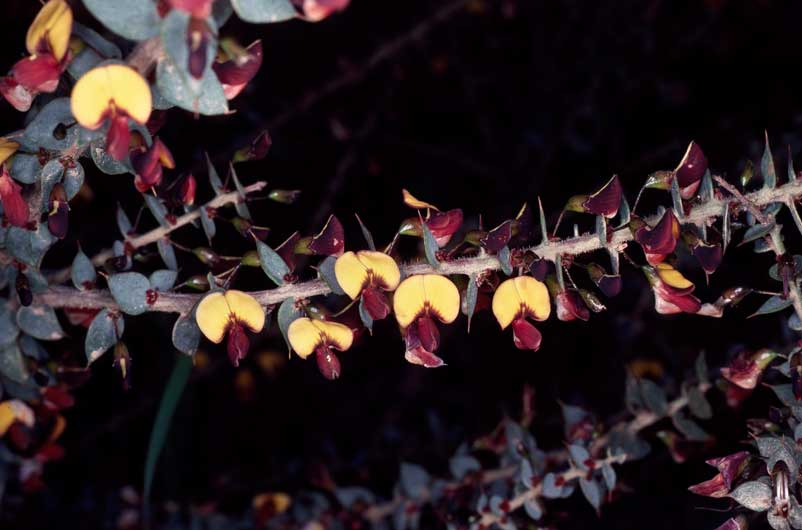

Scientific classification
- Kingdom: Plantae
- Clade: Tracheophytes
- Clade: Angiosperms
- Clade: Eudicots
- Clade: Rosids
- Order: Fabales
- Family: Fabaceae
- Subfamily: Faboideae
- Genus: Daviesia
- Species: D. cardiophylla

Binomial name
- Daviesia cardiophylla Crisp

= Daviesia cardiophylla =

Species of flowering plant

Daviesia cardiophylla is a species of flowering plant in the family Fabaceae and is endemic to the southwest of Western Australia. It is an erect, spreading shrub with heart-shaped, sharply pointed phyllodes and yellow and red flowers.

== Description ==
Daviesia cardiophylla is an erect shrub with widely spreading branchlets and that typically grows to a height of 0.5–1.5 m (1 ft 8 in – 4 ft 11 in). Its leaves are reduced to heart-shaped, sometimes egg-shaped phyllodes, mostly 6–13 mm (0.24–0.51 in) long and 3–6 mm (0.12–0.24 in) wide with a sharply-pointed tip. The flowers are arranged singly or in pairs in leaf axils, each flower on a pedicel 2–8 mm (0.079–0.315 in) long with egg-shaped bracts about 1 mm (0.039 in) long at the base. The sepals are 3.5–4.5 mm (0.14–0.18 in) long and joined at the base, the upper lobes joined for most of their length. The standard petal is yellow or orange with a red centre, 9–10 mm (0.35–0.39 in) long and about 8 mm (0.31 in) wide, the wings red and 8–10 mm (0.31–0.39 in) long and the keel pale red and 10–13 mm (0.39–0.51 in) long. Flowering occurs from May to August and the fruit is a pod 10–15 mm (0.39–0.59 in) long.

== Taxonomy and naming ==
Daviesia cardiophylla was first formally described in 1860 by Ferdinand von Mueller in Fragmenta Phytographiae Australiae from specimens collected by Augustus Oldfield. The specific epithet (cardiophylla) means "heart-leaved".

== Distribution and habitat ==
This species of pea grows in woodland in flat or undulating country mainly in the central and southern wheatbelt, in the Avon Wheatbelt, Coolgardie, Geraldton Sandplains, Jarrah Forest and Mallee biogeographic regions of south-western Western Australia.

== Conservation status ==
Daviesia cardiophylla is classified as "not threatened" by the Department of Biodiversity, Conservation and Attractions.
