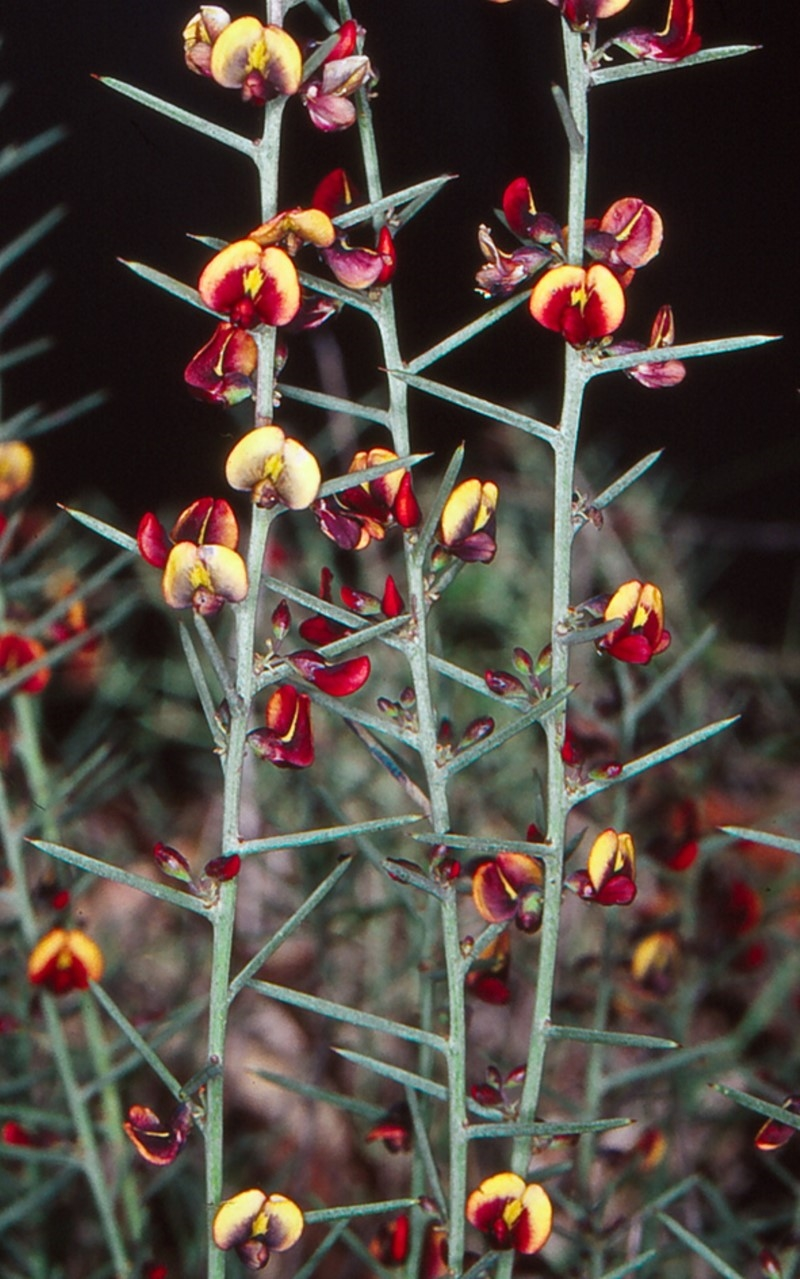
- Daviesia genistifolia in Mulligans Flat Woodland Sanctuary

Scientific classification
- Kingdom: Plantae
- Clade: Tracheophytes
- Clade: Angiosperms
- Clade: Eudicots
- Clade: Rosids
- Order: Fabales
- Family: Fabaceae
- Subfamily: Faboideae
- Genus: Daviesia
- Species: D. genistifolia

Binomial name
- Daviesia genistifolia A.Cunn. ex Benth.

Synonyms
- Daviesia colletioides A.Cunn. ex Benth.; Daviesia genistifolia var. colletioides (A.Cunn. ex Benth.) Benth.; Daviesia genistifolia A.Cunn. ex Benth. var. genistifolia

= Daviesia genistifolia =

Broom bitter-pea

Species of legume

Daviesia genistifolia, commonly known as broom bitter-pea, is a species of flowering plant in the family Fabaceae and is endemic to south-eastern continental Australia. It is a glabrous, low to open shrub with scattered, sharply-pointed, cylindrical phyllodes and yellow or orange-yellow, deep red and maroon flowers.

== Description ==
Daviesia genistifolia is a glabrous, low to open shrub that typically grows to a height of 0.6–2.0 m (2 ft 0 in – 6 ft 7 in). The phyllodes are cylindrical, sharply-pointed, 5–30 mm (0.20–1.18 in) long and 0.5–1.25 mm (0.020–0.049 in) wide at the base. The flowers are arranged in groups of two to six in leaf axils on a peduncle 0.5–1.3 mm (0.020–0.051 in) long, the rachis 1–8 mm (0.039–0.315 in), each flower on a pedicel 1–3 mm (0.039–0.118 in) long with oblong bracts about 1 mm (0.039 in) long. The sepals are 2–4 mm (0.079–0.157 in) long and joined at the base, the upper two lobes joined for most of their length, the lower three with shallow teeth 0.5–0.6 mm (0.020–0.024 in) long. The standard petal is egg-shaped, 4.5–5.5 mm (0.18–0.22 in) long, 5.0–6.5 mm (0.20–0.26 in) wide and yellow or orange-yellow, with a dark red base, the wings 5.0–5.5 mm (0.20–0.22 in) long and deep red, and the keel 4.0–4.5 mm (0.16–0.18 in) long and maroon. Flowering occurs from August to October and the fruit is a flattened triangular pod 8–11 mm (0.31–0.43 in) long.

== Taxonomy ==
Daviesia genistifolia was first formally described in 1837 by George Bentham from an unpublished description by Allan Cunningham. Bentham's description was published in his Commentationes de Leguminosarum Generibus.

== Distribution and habitat ==
Broom bitter-pea grows in dry forests and is widespread in south-eastern Australia from central Queensland through New South Wales to eastern Victoria and the Flinders Ranges in South Australia.
