= Daviesia stricta =

Scientific classification
- Kingdom: Plantae
- Clade: Tracheophytes
- Clade: Angiosperms
- Clade: Eudicots
- Clade: Rosids
- Order: Fabales
- Family: Fabaceae
- Subfamily: Faboideae
- Genus: Daviesia
- Species: D. stricta

Binomial name
- Daviesia stricta Crisp

Species of legume

Daviesia stricta is a species of flowering plant in the family Fabaceae and is endemic to inland areas of South Australia. It is an open, glabrous shrub with narrowly winged branchlets, scattered, narrowly elliptic to linear phyllodes and orange and purplish flowers.

== Description ==
Daviesia stricta is an open shrub that typically grows to a height of up to 1.5 m (4 ft 11 in) and has rigidly erect, narrowly winged branchlets. Its phyllodes are scattered, narrowly elliptic to linear, 10–100 mm (0.39–3.94 in) long, 1.5–15 mm (0.059–0.591 in) wide and leathery with a prominent midrib. The flowers are mainly arranged in two groups of three to five on a peduncle 3–7 mm (0.12–0.28 in) long, each flower on a thin pedicel 2–5 mm (0.079–0.197 in) long with egg-shaped bracts about 3 mm (0.12 in) long at the base. The sepals are 5.0–6.5 mm (0.20–0.26 in) long and joined at the base, the five lobes about equal in length. The standard petal is broadly egg-shaped, about 7.5 mm (0.30 in) long, 6.5 mm (0.26 in) wide and orange with purplish markings. The wings are 5.0–5.5 mm (0.20–0.22 in) long and purplish, the keel 4.5–5 mm (0.18–0.20 in) long and purplish. Flowering occurs in August and September and the fruit is a flattened, triangular pod 9–13 mm (0.35–0.51 in) long.

== Taxonomy ==
Daviesia stricta was first formally described in 1982 by Michael Crisp in the Journal of the Adelaide Botanic Gardens from specimens he collected at Wilpena Pound in 1974. The specific epithet (stricta) means "very upright", referring to the branchlets and phyllodes.

== Distribution and habitat ==
This daviesia grows in shrubland on ridge-tops in the Flinders Ranges of South Australia.
