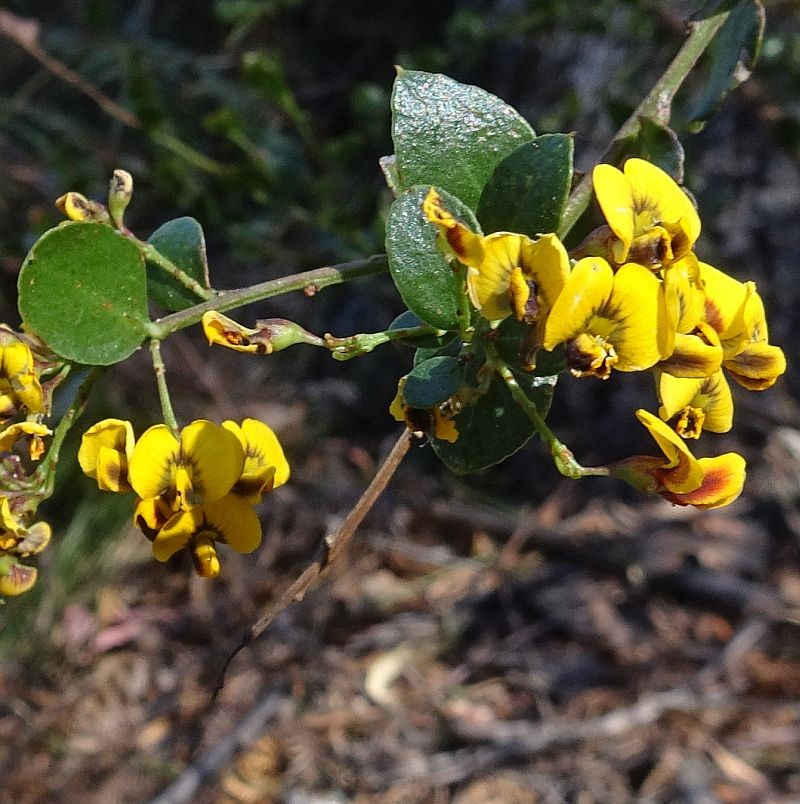
- Daviesia buxifolia in the Mount Imlay National Park

Scientific classification
- Kingdom: Plantae
- Clade: Tracheophytes
- Clade: Angiosperms
- Clade: Eudicots
- Clade: Rosids
- Order: Fabales
- Family: Fabaceae
- Subfamily: Faboideae
- Genus: Daviesia
- Species: D. buxifolia

Binomial name
- Daviesia buxifolia Benth.

= Daviesia buxifolia =

Box-leaf bitter-pea

Species of plant

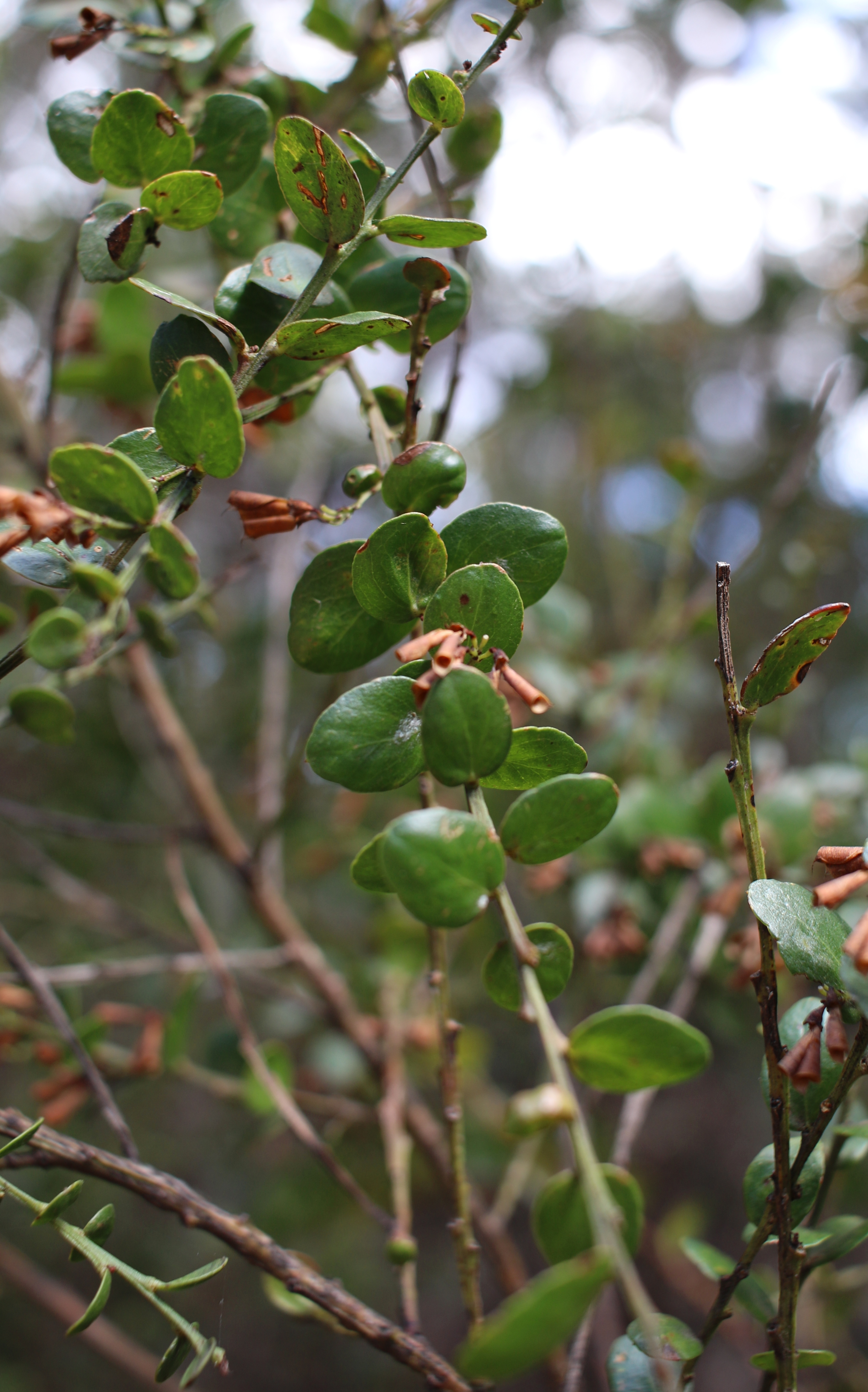
Foliage

Daviesia buxifolia, commonly known as box-leaf bitter-pea, is a species of flowering plant in the family Fabaceae and is endemic to south-eastern continental Australia. It is an open shrub with egg-shaped to round phyllodes and yellow or yellowish-orange and maroon-brown flowers.

== Description ==
Daviesia buxifolia is an open, glabrous shrub that typically grows to a height of 0.5–2 m (1 ft 8 in – 6 ft 7 in), often with weeping branches. Its leaves are reduced to often crowded, egg-shaped to round phyllodes 3–30 mm (0.12–1.18 in) long and 3–21 mm (0.12–0.83 in) wide. Juvenile phyllodes are slightly larger than the adult leaves. The flowers are arranged in groups of four to seven in leaf axils on a peduncle 5–10 mm (0.20–0.39 in) long, each flower on a pedicel 2–6 mm (0.079–0.236 in) long, the rachis 3–15 mm (0.12–0.59 in) long with narrow oblong bracts about 1 mm (0.039 in) long on the pedicels. The sepals are 3–5 mm (0.12–0.20 in) long and joined at the base, the two upper lobes forming a broad lip and the lower three triangular. The standard petal is broadly egg-shaped with the narrower end towards the base, about 6.5 mm (0.26 in) long and wide and yellow or orange-yellow with brownish maroon markings. The wings are 5.5–7 mm (0.22–0.28 in) long and brownish maroon with yellow edges, and the keel is about 4 mm (0.16 in) long and brownish maroon. Flowering occurs in October and November and the fruit is a flattened, triangular pod 6–7 mm (0.24–0.28 in) long.

== Taxonomy ==
Daviesia buxifolia was first formally described in 1864 by George Bentham in Flora Australiensis. The specific epithet (buxifolia) means "box-tree-leaved".

== Distribution and habitat ==
Box-leaf bitter-pea grows in poor or clay soils in forest, usually in mountainous terrain, south from the Tuross River in far south-eastern New South Wales to eastern Victoria.
