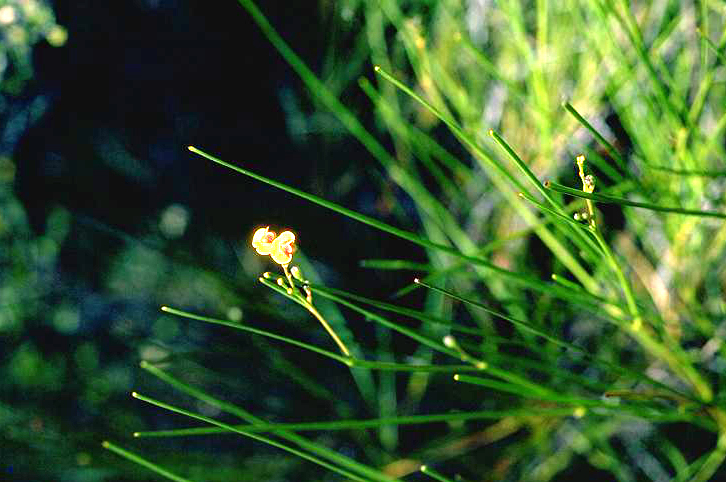
- Near Esperance

Conservation status
- Priority Three — Poorly Known Taxa (DEC)

Scientific classification
- Kingdom: Plantae
- Clade: Tracheophytes
- Clade: Angiosperms
- Clade: Eudicots
- Clade: Rosids
- Order: Fabales
- Family: Fabaceae
- Subfamily: Faboideae
- Genus: Daviesia
- Species: D. pauciflora

Binomial name
- Daviesia pauciflora Crisp

= Daviesia pauciflora =

Species of flowering plant

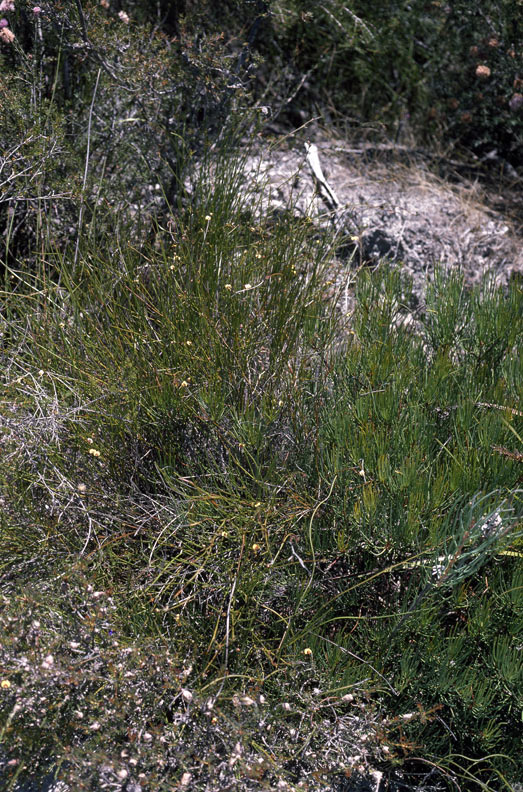
Habit

Daviesia pauciflora is a species of flowering plant in the family Fabaceae and is endemic to the south of Western Australia. It is an open shrub with many stems, flattened, linear phyllodes, and mostly yellow flowers with red, orange and dull brownish markings.

== Description ==
Daviesia pauciflora is an open shrub that typically grows to a height of up to about 30–80 cm (12–31 in) and has many ribbed stems. Its phyllodes are scattered and erect, linear and flattened, up to 400 mm (16 in) long and 1.0–1.5 mm (0.039–0.059 in) wide with parallel ribs. The flowers are arranged in leaf axils in racemes of up to three, the raceme on a peduncle 1–13 mm (0.039–0.512 in) long, the rachis up to 5 mm (0.20 in) long, each flower on a pedicel 1.5–10 mm (0.059–0.394 in) long with egg-shaped bracts 1.0–1.5 mm (0.039–0.059 in) long at the base. The sepals are 4–5 mm (0.16–0.20 in) long and joined for most of their length apart from five small lobes. The standard petal is broadly elliptic with a notched centre, about 8 mm (0.31 in) long, 10 mm (0.39 in) wide, and mostly yellow with a red base and yellow centre. The wings are about 6 mm (0.24 in) long and dark red with orange tips, the keel about 5 mm (0.20 in) long and dull brownish. Flowering occurs from October to January and the fruit is a flattened, triangular pod 11–14 mm (0.43–0.55 in) long.

== Taxonomy and naming ==
Daviesia pauciflora was first formally described in 1995 by Michael Crisp in Australian Systematic Botany from specimens collected by Anthony Orchard near Esperance in 1968. The specific epithet (pauciflora) means "few-flowered".

== Distribution and habitat ==
This daviesia grows in tall, dense heath from near Munglinup to Esperance in the Esperance Plains and Mallee biogeographic regions in the south of Western Australia.

== Conservation status ==
Daviesia pauciflora is listed as "Priority Three" by the Government of Western Australia Department of Biodiversity, Conservation and Attractions, meaning that it is poorly known and known from only a few locations but is not under imminent threat.
