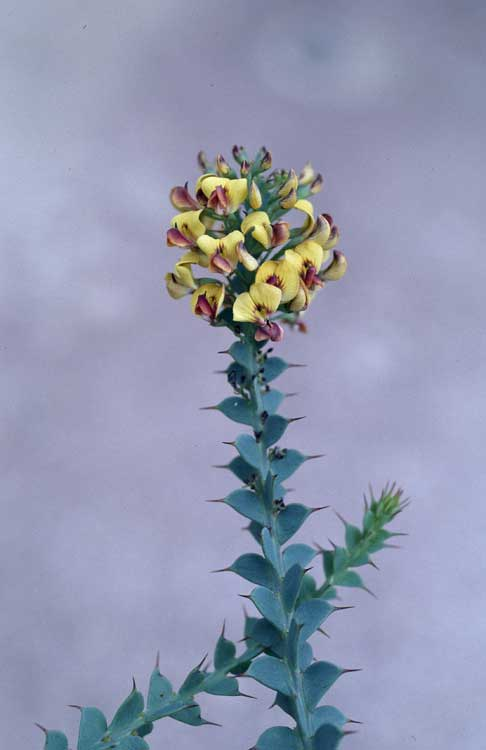
- In the Australian National Botanic Gardens

Scientific classification
- Kingdom: Plantae
- Clade: Tracheophytes
- Clade: Angiosperms
- Clade: Eudicots
- Clade: Rosids
- Order: Fabales
- Family: Fabaceae
- Subfamily: Faboideae
- Genus: Daviesia
- Species: D. striata

Binomial name
- Daviesia striata Turcz.

Synonyms
- Daviesia adnata F.Muell.

= Daviesia striata =

Species of legume

Daviesia striata is a species of flowering plant in the family Fabaceae and is endemic to the south of Western Australia. It is a rigid, glabrous shrub with erect branchlets, crowded, vertically compressed, sharply-pointed phyllodes, and yellow and red flowers.

== Description ==
Daviesia striata is rigid, open, glabrous and glaucous shrub that typically grows to a height of up to 1.2 m (3 ft 11 in) and has erect branchlets. Its phyllodes are crowded with the bases overlapping, vertically compressed, 7–16 mm (0.28–0.63 in) long and 4.0–6.5 mm (0.16–0.26 in) wide with a sharply pointed tip. The flowers are arranged in a group of four to seven in leaf axils on a peduncle 2.0–3.5 mm (0.079–0.138 in) long, the rachis 2.5–4.5 mm (0.098–0.177 in) long, each flower on a pedicel 3.5–7 mm (0.14–0.28 in) long. The sepals are about 4 mm (0.16 in) long and joined at the base, the upper two lobes joined for most of their length and the lower three triangular. The standard petal is broadly elliptic, 7.5–9 mm (0.30–0.35 in) long, 7.5–8.5 mm (0.30–0.33 in) wide and yellow with a red ring around a yellow centre. The wings are about 8 mm (0.31 in) long and red, the keel 6.5–7.5 mm (0.26–0.30 in) long and red. Flowering occurs throughout the year and the fruit is a triangular pod 10–12 mm (0.39–0.47 in) long.

== Taxonomy ==
Daviesia striata was first formally described in 1853 by Nikolai Turczaninow in the Bulletin de la Société Impériale des Naturalistes de Moscou. The specific epithet (striata) refers to the stem and phyllodes.

== Distribution and habitat ==
This daviesia usually grows in coastal heath and is found in the south of Western Australia between Bremer Bay and East Mount Barren in the Esperance Plains biogeographic region.

== Conservation status ==
Daviesia striata is classified as "not threatened" by the Government of Western Australia Department of Biodiversity, Conservation and Attractions.
