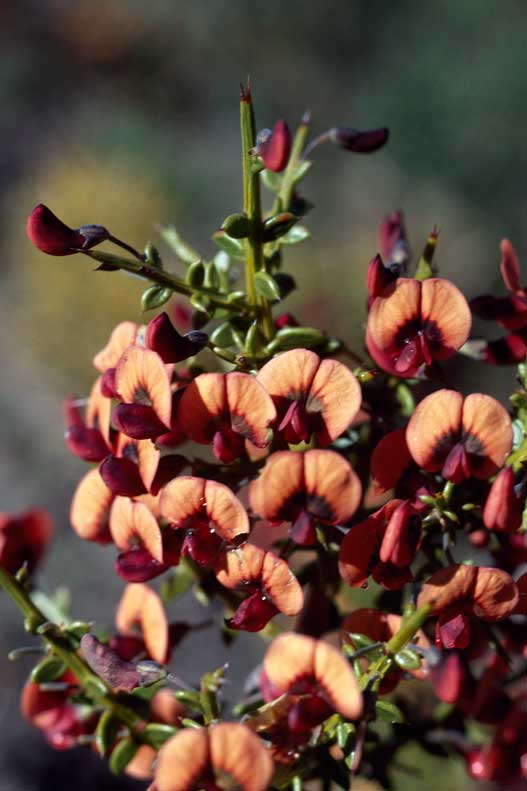
- Near Beverley

Scientific classification
- Kingdom: Plantae
- Clade: Tracheophytes
- Clade: Angiosperms
- Clade: Eudicots
- Clade: Rosids
- Order: Fabales
- Family: Fabaceae
- Subfamily: Faboideae
- Genus: Daviesia
- Species: D. microphylla

Binomial name
- Daviesia microphylla Benth.

Synonyms
- Daviesia parvifolia S.Moore

= Daviesia microphylla =

Species of flowering plant

Daviesia microphylla is a species of flowering plant in the family Fabaceae and is endemic to the south-west of Western Australia. It is an openly-branched, sprawling shrub with spiny branchlets, crowded, sharply-pointed, egg-shaped phyllodes, and orange, dark red and maroon flowers.

== Description ==
Daviesia microphylla is an openly-branched, sprawling shrub, typically up to 0.6 m (2 ft 0 in) high and 1 m (3 ft 3 in) wide with sharply-ridged, spiny branchlets. Its phyllodes are crowded, partly overlapping, vertically flattened, egg-shaped and sharply pointed, mostly 2.5–5 mm (0.098–0.197 in) long and 1–2 mm (0.039–0.079 in) wide. The flowers are arranged singly in leaf axils on a peduncle mostly 3.5–4.5 mm (0.14–0.18 in) long with bracts 0.5–1 mm (0.020–0.039 in) long at the base. The sepals are 2.5–3.0 mm (0.098–0.118 in) long and joined at the base, the two upper lobes joined for most of their length, the three lower lobes triangular and up to 0.5 mm (0.020 in) long. The standard petal is broadly egg-shaped with a notched tip, 8–9 mm (0.31–0.35 in) long and orange with a dark red sentre, the wings 8.0–8.5 mm (0.31–0.33 in) long and maroon, and the keel about 8.0–8.5 mm (0.31–0.33 in) long and maroon. Flowering occurs from June to August and the fruit is an inflated, triangular pod 11–14 mm (0.43–0.55 in) long.

== Taxonomy and naming ==
Daviesia microphylla was first formally described in 1864 by George Bentham in Flora Australiensis from specimens collected by James Drummond. The specific epithet (microphylla) means "small-leaved", referring to the phyllodes.

== Distribution and habitat ==
This daviesia grows in woodland or low heath and is found in the eastern Darling Range, but had a more extensive range in the past.

== Conservation status ==
Daviesia microphylla is listed as "not threatened" by the Department of Biodiversity, Conservation and Attractions.
