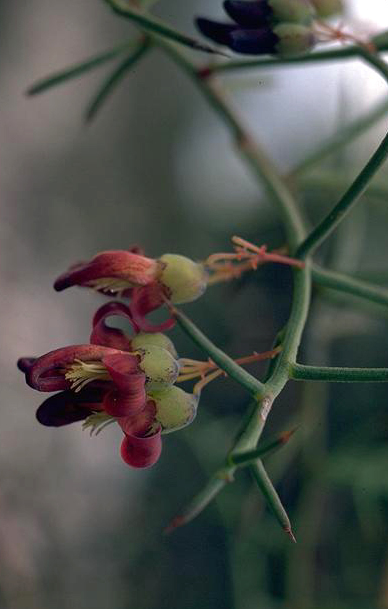
- Daviesia glossosema in the Stirling Range

Scientific classification
- Kingdom: Plantae
- Clade: Tracheophytes
- Clade: Angiosperms
- Clade: Eudicots
- Clade: Rosids
- Order: Fabales
- Family: Fabaceae
- Subfamily: Faboideae
- Genus: Daviesia
- Species: D. glossosema

Binomial name
- Daviesia glossosema Crisp

= Daviesia glossosema =

Maroon-flowered daviesia

Species of flowering plant

Daviesia glossosema, commonly known as maroon-flowered daviesia, is a species of flowering plant in the family Fabaceae and is endemic to a restricted area of south-western Western Australia. It is an erect shrub with tangled, spreading branches, cylindrical, sharply-pointed phyllodes, and unusually-shaped maroon flowers.

== Description ==
Daviesia glossosema is an erect shrub that typically grows to a height of 0.5–1 m (1 ft 8 in – 3 ft 3 in) and has spreading, tangled branches with glaucous foliage. Its leaves are reduced to scattered, erect, needle-shaped, sharply-pointed phyllodes 8–40 mm (0.31–1.57 in) long and about 1 mm (0.039 in) wide. The flowers are arranged in racemes of two to five on a peduncle 4–7 mm (0.16–0.28 in) long, the rachis 1–3 mm (0.039–0.118 in) long, each flower on a pedicel 3–5 mm (0.12–0.20 in) long with bracts about 1 mm (0.039 in) long at the base. The sepals are about 4 mm (0.16 in) long and joined at the base with minute teeth. The petals are maroon, the standard egg-shaped, 10.0–10.5 mm (0.39–0.41 in) long and curved backwards, the wings about 11.5–13.5 mm (0.45–0.53 in) long and curved inwards exposing the keel and stamens, and the keel is about 8 mm (0.31 in) long. Flowering occurs from September to November and the fruit is an inflated triangular pod 14–20 mm (0.55–0.79 in) long.

== Taxonomy and naming ==
Daviesia glossosema was first formally described in 1995 by Michael Crisp in Australian Systematic Botany. The specific epithet (glossosema) is derived from words meaning "tongue" and "standard", referring to the unusual shape of that petal.

== Distribution and habitat ==
Maroon-flowered daviesia grows in heath in a small area of the Stirling Range in the south-west of Western Australia.

== Conservation status ==
Daviesia glossosema is listed as "Threatened Flora (Declared Rare Flora — Extant)" by the Department of Biodiversity, Conservation and Attractions and an Interim Recovery Plan has been prepared.
