= Daviesia eremaea =

Scientific classification
- Kingdom: Plantae
- Clade: Tracheophytes
- Clade: Angiosperms
- Clade: Eudicots
- Clade: Rosids
- Order: Fabales
- Family: Fabaceae
- Subfamily: Faboideae
- Genus: Daviesia
- Species: D. eremaea

Binomial name
- Daviesia eremaea Crisp

Species of flowering plant

Daviesia eremaea is a species of flowering plant in the family Fabaceae and is endemic to central Australia. It is an erect, glabrous, multi-stemmed shrub with needle-like, more or less sharply-pointed phyllodes, and yellow and red flowers.

== Description ==
Daviesia eremaea is an erect, glabrous, multi-stemmed shrub that typically grows to a height of 0.9–2 m (2 ft 11 in – 6 ft 7 in). Its leaves are reduced to scattered, erect, needle-shaped, more or less sharply-pointed phyllodes 40–120 mm (1.6–4.7 in) long and about 1 mm (0.039 in) wide. The flowers are arranged in racemes of two to five on a peduncle 1–2 mm (0.039–0.079 in) long, the rachis 2–7 mm (0.079–0.276 in) long, each flower on a thin pedicel 4–8 mm (0.16–0.31 in) long with spatula-shaped bracts about 1 mm (0.039 in) long at the base. The sepals are 3.5–4.5 mm (0.14–0.18 in) long forming a bell shaped base with lobes about 0.5 mm (0.020 in) long. The standard petal is elliptic, about 6 mm (0.24 in) long, 7 mm (0.28 in) wide and yellow with a red base, the wings about 5 mm (0.20 in) long and red, and the keel about 4.5 mm (0.18 in) long and red. Flowering occurs from August to October and the fruit is a triangular pod 7–8 mm (0.28–0.31 in) long.

== Taxonomy and naming ==
Daviesia eremaea was first formally described in 1980 by Michael Crisp in the Journal of the Adelaide Botanic Gardens. The specific epithet (eremaea) refers to the desert habitat of this species.

== Distribution and habitat ==
Daviesia eremaea grows on sand dunes in grassland, sometimes on mountain slopes in mallee from near Alice Springs in the Northern Territory, west to the Pilbara and Great Victoria Desert regions of Western Australia and south to near the border with South Australia.

== Conservation status ==
This species of pea is classified as "not threatened" by the Western Australian Government Department of Biodiversity, Conservation and Attractions.
