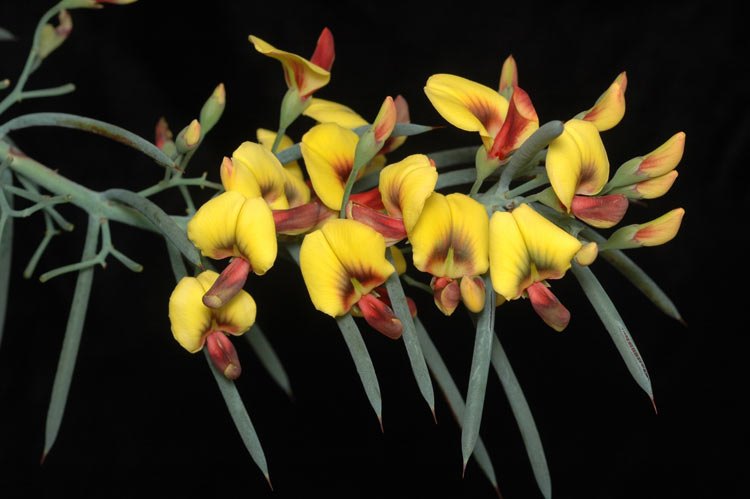
- In the Australian National Botanic Gardens

Scientific classification
- Kingdom: Plantae
- Clade: Tracheophytes
- Clade: Angiosperms
- Clade: Eudicots
- Clade: Rosids
- Order: Fabales
- Family: Fabaceae
- Subfamily: Faboideae
- Genus: Daviesia
- Species: D. grossa

Binomial name
- Daviesia grossa Crisp

= Daviesia grossa =

Species of flowering plant

Daviesia grossa is a species of flowering plant in the family Fabaceae and is endemic to the south-west of Western Australia. It is an erect, glabrous, spindly shrub with crowded phyllodes and yellow and dark red flowers.

== Description ==
Daviesia grossa is an erect, broombush-like, glabrous shrub that typically grows to a height of up to 3 m (9.8 ft). Its phyllodes are crowded, linear to fusiform, 25–55 mm (0.98–2.17 in) long, 1.5–2.5 mm (0.059–0.098 in) long and sharply pointed. The flowers are arranged in groups of two or three in leaf axils on a peduncle 6–10 mm (0.24–0.39 in) long, the rachis 1.5–10 mm (0.059–0.394 in) long, each flower on a pedicel 3–15 mm (0.12–0.59 in) long with bracts about 1 mm (0.039 in) long at the base. The sepals are 7–8 mm (0.28–0.31 in) long and joined at the base, the upper two lobes joined for most of their length and the lower three pointed. The standard petal is broadly elliptic, 14.5–17 mm (0.57–0.67 in) long and yellow with a dark red centre, the wings 14.5–17.5 mm (0.57–0.69 in) long and dark red, and the keel is 15.0–15.5 mm (0.59–0.61 in) long and dull dark red. Flowering occurs from November to April and the fruit is an inflated triangular pod 15–20 mm (0.59–0.79 in) long.

== Taxonomy and naming ==
Daviesia grossa was first formally described in 1995 by Michael Crisp in Australian Systematic Botany from specimens he collected in the Cape Arid National Park in 1979. The specific epithet (grossa) means "large or thick".

== Distribution and habitat ==
This daviesia grows on exposed, rocky places or in heath, but is only known from parts of the Cape Arid National Park in the Mallee region of south-western Western Australia.

== Conservation status ==
Daviesia grossa is listed as "not threatened" by the Department of Biodiversity, Conservation and Attractions.
