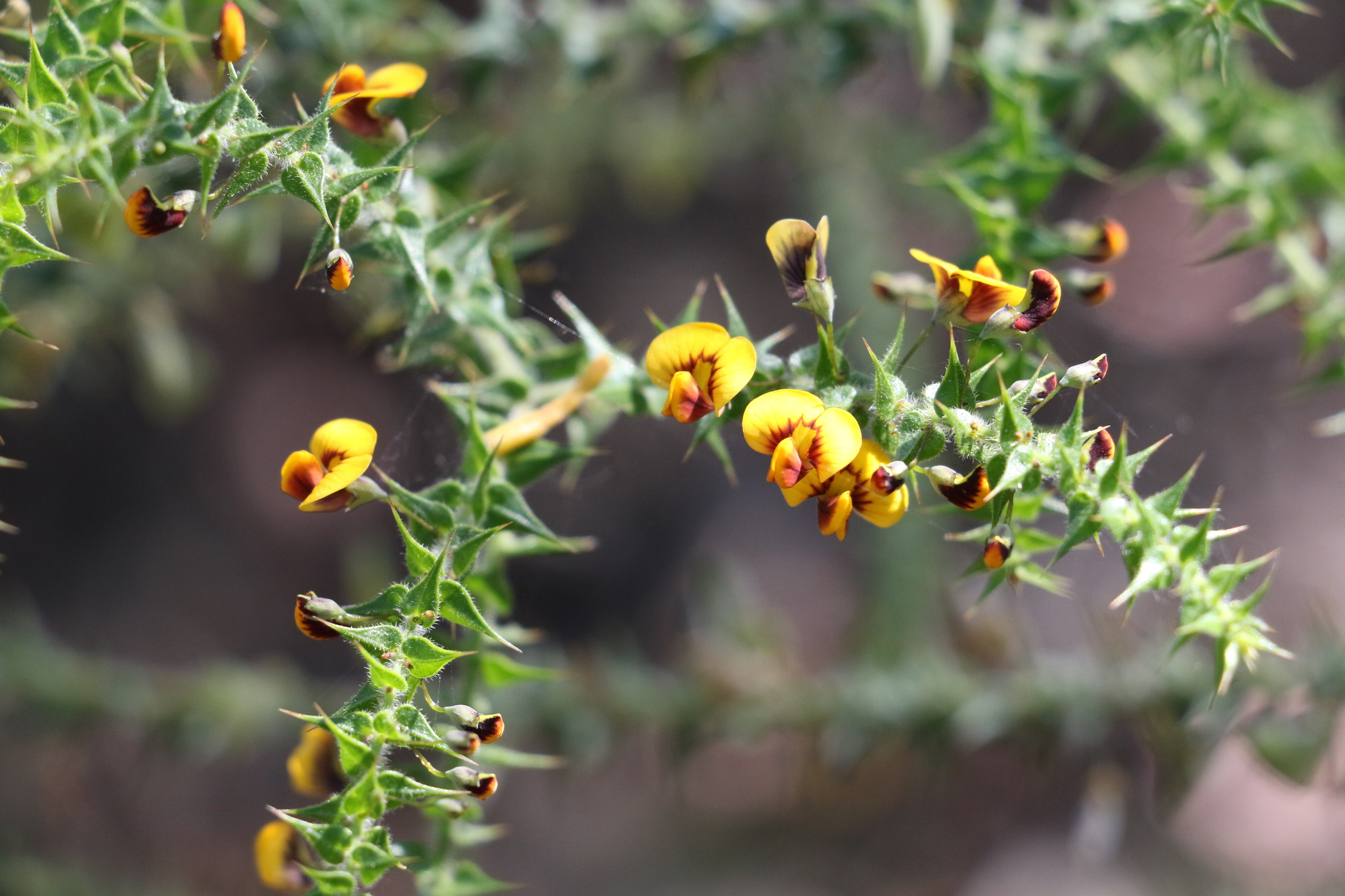
- Near Helidon

Scientific classification
- Kingdom: Plantae
- Clade: Tracheophytes
- Clade: Angiosperms
- Clade: Eudicots
- Clade: Rosids
- Order: Fabales
- Family: Fabaceae
- Subfamily: Faboideae
- Genus: Daviesia
- Species: D. villifera

Binomial name
- Daviesia villifera F.M.Bailey

= Daviesia villifera =

Species of flowering plant

Daviesia villifera is a species of flowering plant in the family Fabaceae and is endemic to eastern Australia. It is a hairy shrub with arching branches, sharply-pointed egg-shaped to heart-shaped phyllodes, and yellow and dark red flowers.

== Description ==
Daviesia villifera is an open shrub with arching branches, that typically grows to a height of 1.5–2 m (4 ft 11 in – 6 ft 7 in) and has most parts covered with bristly hairs. The phyllodes are crowded, broadly to narrowly egg-shaped to heart-shaped, 5–10 mm (0.20–0.39 in) long and 2–6 mm (0.079–0.236 in) wide and sharply-pointed. The flowers are arranged singly or in pairs in leaf axils on a peduncle 0.5–1.1 mm (0.020–0.043 in) long, the individual flowers on a pedicel 1.5–8.5 mm (0.059–0.335 in) long. The sepals are 2.4–2.9 mm (0.094–0.114 in) long and joined at the base, the upper two joined for most of their length and the lower three broadly triangular. The standard petal is egg-shaped, about 5 mm (0.20 in) long and 5.75 mm (0.226 in) wide and yellow with a red base and rich yellow centre, the wings yellow with a red base and about 5 mm (0.20 in) long, and the keel dull red and 4.75 mm (0.187 in) long. Flowering occurs from June to October and the fruit is a flattened triangular pod 9–11 mm (0.35–0.43 in) long.

== Taxonomy and naming ==
Daviesia villifera was first formally described in 1837 by George Bentham from an unpublished description by Allan Cunningham. Bentham's description was published in his Commentationes de Leguminosarum Generibus. The specific epithet (villifera) means "bearing woolly or shaggy hair".

== Distribution and habitat ==
This bitter-pea usually in forest between Carnarvon National Park to Brisbane in Queensland, and near Grafton in northern New South Wales.
