= Daviesia pleurophylla =

Conservation status
- Priority Two — Poorly Known Taxa (DEC)

Scientific classification
- Kingdom: Plantae
- Clade: Tracheophytes
- Clade: Angiosperms
- Clade: Eudicots
- Clade: Rosids
- Order: Fabales
- Family: Fabaceae
- Subfamily: Faboideae
- Genus: Daviesia
- Species: D. pleurophylla

Binomial name
- Daviesia pleurophylla Crisp

Species of flowering plant

Daviesia pleurophylla is a species of flowering plant in the family Fabaceae and is endemic to a restricted area in the north of Western Australia. It is a large, openly-branched shrub with many ribbed branchlets, scattered, sharply-pointed, needle-shaped phyllodes, and yellow and dark red flowers.

== Description ==
Daviesia pleurophylla is an openly-branched shrub that typically grows to a height of up to 3 m (9.8 ft) and has many ribbed branchlets. Its phyllodes are scattered, widely spreading, needle-shaped and sharply-pointed, 5–25 mm (0.20–0.98 in) long and about 0.75 mm (0.030 in) wide. The flowers are arranged in leaf axils in groups of two to four, the groups on a peduncle 3–18 mm (0.12–0.71 in) long, the rachis up to 6 mm (0.24 in) long, each flower on a pedicel 2–4 mm (0.079–0.157 in) long with narrow oblong bracts about 1 mm (0.039 in) long at the base. The sepals are 3–4 mm (0.12–0.16 in) long and joined at the base with ten ribs and small teeth on the end. The standard petal is elliptic with a notched centre, about 5.5 mm (0.22 in) long, 6 mm (0.24 in) wide, and yellow and dark red. The wings are about 5 mm (0.20 in) long and the keel about 4 mm (0.16 in) long. Flowering has been observed in September and the fruit is a flattened, triangular pod 13–14 mm (0.51–0.55 in) long.

== Taxonomy and naming ==
Daviesia pleurophylla was first formally described in 1995 by Michael Crisp in Australian Systematic Botany from specimens collected by Alex George in the Cape Range in 1970. The specific epithet (pleurophylla) means "rib-leaved".

== Distribution and habitat ==
This daviesia grows in open shrubland on deep sand and is only known from the Cape Range-Exmouth area in the north-west of Western Australia.

== Conservation status ==
Daviesia pleurophylla is listed as "Priority Two" by the Western Australian Government Department of Biodiversity, Conservation and Attractions, meaning that it is poorly known and from only one or a few locations.
