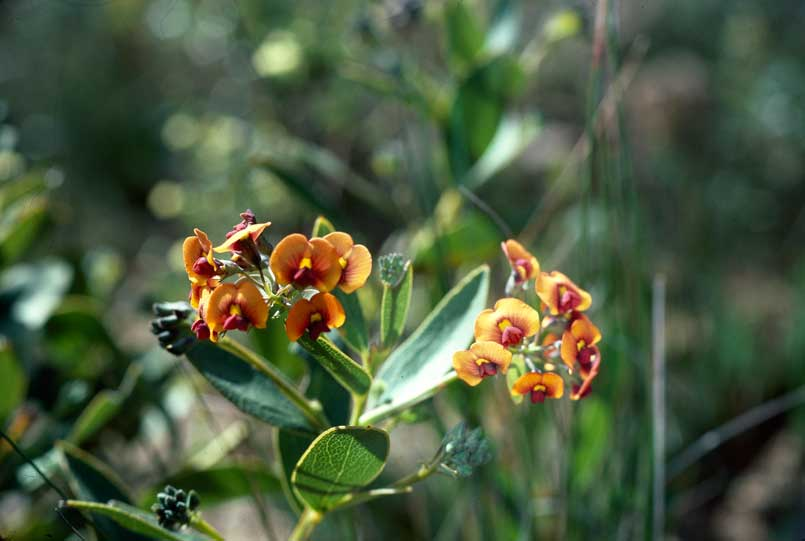
- Daviesia ovata on Mount Manypeaks

Conservation status
- Declared rare (DEC)

Scientific classification
- Kingdom: Plantae
- Clade: Tracheophytes
- Clade: Angiosperms
- Clade: Eudicots
- Clade: Rosids
- Order: Fabales
- Family: Fabaceae
- Subfamily: Faboideae
- Genus: Daviesia
- Species: D. ovata

Binomial name
- Daviesia ovata Benth.

= Daviesia ovata =

Broad-leaf daviesia

Species of legume

Daviesia ovata, commonly known as broad-leaf daviesia, is a species of flowering plant in the family Fabaceae and is endemic to a restricted part of the south-west of Western Australia. It is a dense, bushy, glabrous shrub with egg-shaped to elliptic phyllodes and orange and maroon flowers.

== Description ==
Daviesia ovata is a dense, bushy shrub that typically grows to a height of up to 1.8 m (5 ft 11 in) with erect, prominently ridges branchlets. Its phyllodes are scattered, erect and egg-shaped to elliptic, 28–77 mm (1.1–3.0 in) long and 14–37 mm (0.55–1.46 in) wide. The flowers are arranged in leaf axils in groups of eight to eleven flowers on a peduncle 14–30 mm (0.55–1.18 in) long, the rachis 5.5–7.0 mm (0.22–0.28 in) long, each flower on a pedicel 3.5–7.0 mm (0.14–0.28 in) long with bracts 2–3 mm (0.079–0.118 in) long at the base. The sepals are 4.5–5.5 mm (0.18–0.22 in) long and joined at the base, the upper two with lobes about 1.5 mm (0.059 in) long and the lower three lobes about 1 mm (0.039 in) long. The standard petal is elliptic with a notched tip, 7–8 mm (0.28–0.31 in) long, 8.5–9.5 mm (0.33–0.37 in) wide, and orange with a red ring around a yellow centre. The wings are 6.5–10.5 mm (0.26–0.41 in) long and the keel about 6 mm (0.24 in) long and maroon. Flowering occurs in September and the fruit is a triangular pod about 14 mm (0.55 in) long.

== Taxonomy ==
Daviesia ovata was first described in 1864 by George Bentham in Flora Australiensis from specimens collected by James Drummond. The specific epithet (ovata) means "wider below the middle".

== Distribution and habitat ==
Broad-leaf daviesia grows among granite rocks in low mallee-heath or shrubland near Mount Manypeaks, east of Albany in the Esperance Plains biogeographic region of south-western Western Australia.

== Conservation status ==
This daviesia is listed as "Threatened" by the Western Australian Government Department of Parks and Wildlife, meaning that it is in danger of extinction.
