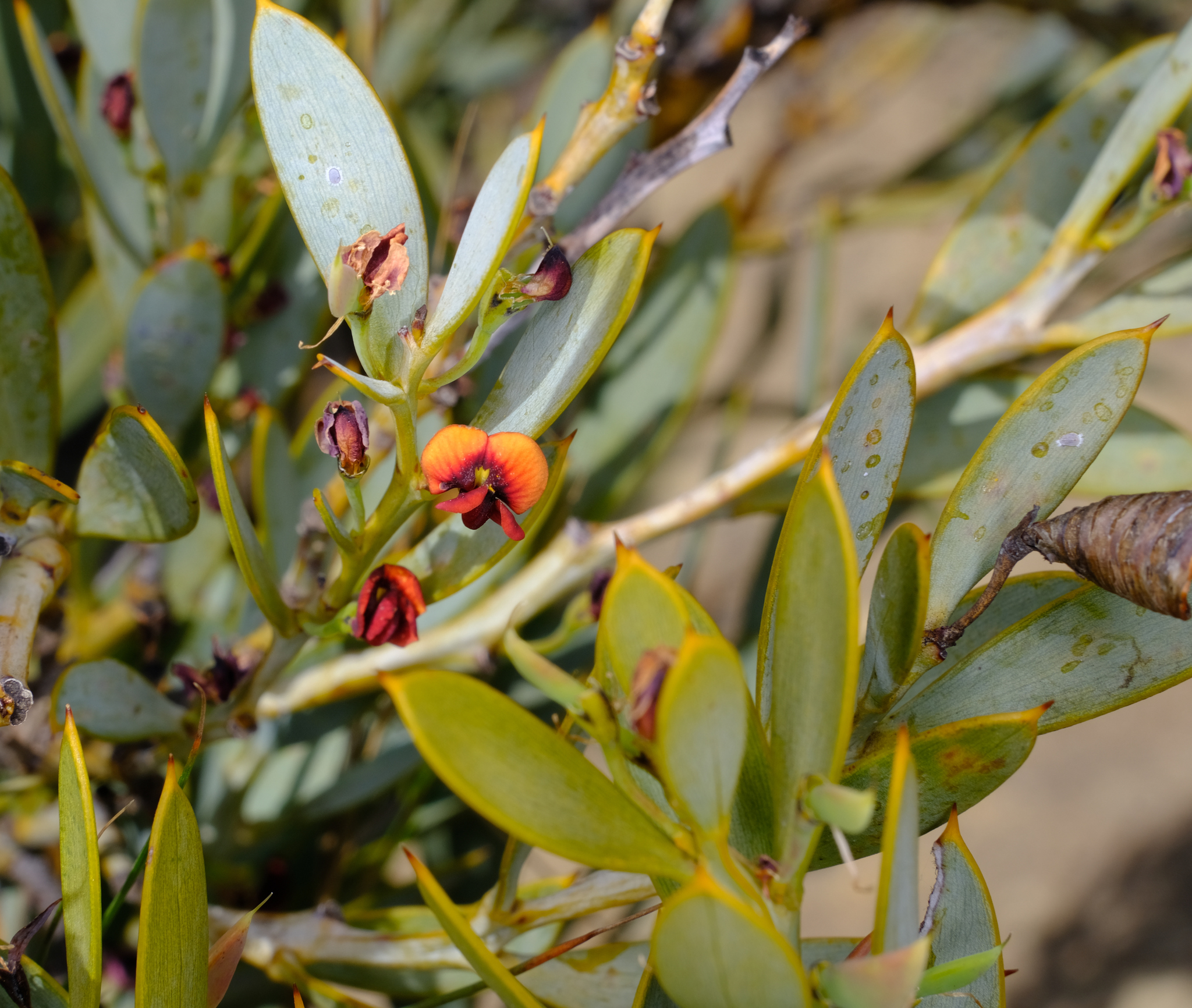

Scientific classification
- Kingdom: Plantae
- Clade: Tracheophytes
- Clade: Angiosperms
- Clade: Eudicots
- Clade: Rosids
- Order: Fabales
- Family: Fabaceae
- Subfamily: Faboideae
- Genus: Daviesia
- Species: D. audax

Binomial name
- Daviesia audax Crisp

= Daviesia audax =

Species of flowering plant

Daviesia audax is a species of flowering plant in the family Fabaceae and is endemic to the south-west of Western Australia. It is an erect shrub with scattered, erect, thick, rigid, sharply pointed phyllodes, and orange flowers with reddish-brown markings.

== Description ==
Daviesia audax is an erect, glabrous shrub that typically grows up to 2 m (6 ft 7 in) with erect, angular branchlets. Its leaves are reduced to scattered, erect, thick, rigid, narrowly elliptic to narrowly egg-shaped phyllodes, mostly 25–65 mm (0.98–2.56 in) long and about 5–10 mm (0.20–0.39 in) wide. The flowers are arranged in groups of up to three in leaf axils, each flower on a pedicel 2–4 mm (0.079–0.157 in) long with a cluster of bracts about 1 mm (0.039 in) long at the base. The sepals are 4.0–4.5 mm (0.16–0.18 in) long, the two upper joined in a broad "lip" and the lower three smaller and triangular. The petals are orange with reddish-brown markings, standard petal 5–7 mm (0.20–0.28 in) long and 5.5–8 mm (0.22–0.31 in) wide, the wings 5–6 mm (0.20–0.24 in) long and the keel 5–6 mm (0.20–0.24 in) long. Flowering occurs from August to October and the fruit is a flattened triangular pod 18–25 mm (0.71–0.98 in) long.

== Taxonomy and naming ==
Daviesia audax was first formally described in 1995 by Michael Crisp in Australian Systematic Botany from specimens collected near Harrismith in 1979. The specific epithet (audax) means "bold", referring to sharply-pointed phyllodes.

== Distribution and habitat ==
This species of pea grows in heathland with tall Grevillea species and is found in a narrow band between Harrismith and Lake King in the Avon Wheatbelt and Mallee biogeographic regions in the south-west of Western Australia.

== Conservation status ==
Daviesia audax is classified as "not threatened" by the Government of Western Australia Department of Biodiversity, Conservation and Attractions.
