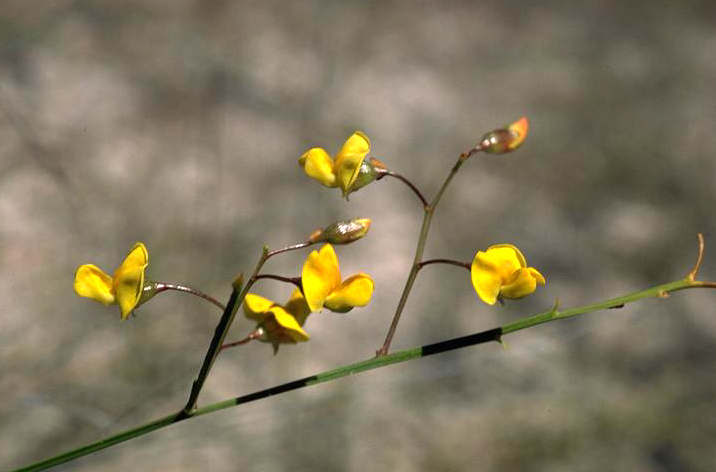
- In Kakadu National Park

Scientific classification
- Kingdom: Plantae
- Clade: Tracheophytes
- Clade: Angiosperms
- Clade: Eudicots
- Clade: Rosids
- Order: Fabales
- Family: Fabaceae
- Subfamily: Faboideae
- Genus: Daviesia
- Species: D. reclinata

Binomial name
- Daviesia reclinata A.Cunn. ex Benth.

= Daviesia reclinata =

Species of flowering plant

Daviesia reclinata is a species of flowering plant in the family Fabaceae and is endemic to northern Australia. It is a prostrate or straggling shrub with scattered linear phyllodes, and yellow flowers.

== Description ==
Daviesia reclinata is a glabrous, prostrate or straggling shrub that typically grows to a height of up to 2 m (6 ft 7 in). The phyllodes are scattered, sometimes reduced to scales, linear to elliptic, 10–150 mm (0.39–5.91 in) long and 1–6 mm (0.039–0.236 in) wide. The flowers are arranged in leaf axils and on the ends of branches, usually in racemes of five to ten widely-spaced yellow flowers. The racemes in leaf axils are on a peduncle 6–110 mm (0.24–4.33 in) long, the rachis 10–140 mm (0.39–5.51 in) long, each flower on a pedicel 2.5–6.5 mm (0.098–0.256 in) long with bracts about 0.75 mm (0.030 in) long at the base. The sepals are 4–5 mm (0.16–0.20 in) long, joined at the base and prominently ribbed, the upper two lobes oblong, about 2.5 mm (0.098 in) long, the lower three 1.5–2 mm (0.059–0.079 in) long. The standard petal is broadly egg-shaped, 7–8.5 mm (0.28–0.33 in) long, 6–7 mm (0.24–0.28 in) wide, the wings about 7 mm (0.28 in) long, and the keel about 6 mm (0.24 in) long. Flowering occurs throughout the year and the fruit is a flattened triangular pod 10–13 mm (0.39–0.51 in) long.

== Taxonomy and naming ==
Daviesia reclinata was first formally described in 1837 by George Bentham from an unpublished manuscript by Allan Cunningham. Bentham's description was published in Flora Australiensis. The specific epithet (reclinata) means "leaning back, referring to the branches".

== Distribution and habitat ==
This bitter-pea grows in forest or woodland on stony or sandy soil and is found the Kimberley region of Western Australian and the Top End of the Northern Territory. Michael Crisp considers populations formerly known as D. reclinata on the Cape York Peninsula of Queensland, to be D. flava.
