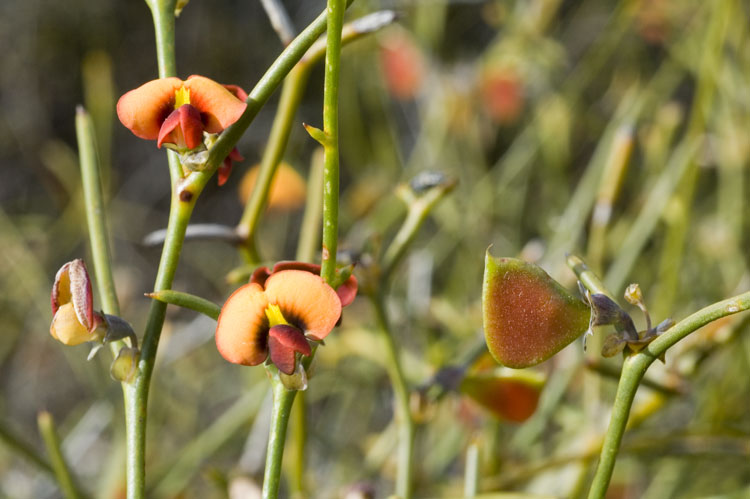
- At Lucky Bay

Scientific classification
- Kingdom: Plantae
- Clade: Tracheophytes
- Clade: Angiosperms
- Clade: Eudicots
- Clade: Rosids
- Order: Fabales
- Family: Fabaceae
- Subfamily: Faboideae
- Genus: Daviesia
- Species: D. major

Binomial name
- Daviesia major (Benth.) Crisp

= Daviesia major =

Species of flowering plant

Daviesia major is a species of flowering plant in the family Fabaceae and is endemic to the south-west of Western Australia. It is an erect, many-stemmed shrub with scattered, erect, sharply-pointed, cylindrical phyllodes and orange and red flowers.

== Description ==
Daviesia major is a bushy, many-stemmed shrub, that typically grows up to 70 cm (28 in) high and about 1 m (3 ft 3 in) wide, often with spreading, tangled branchlets. Its phyllodes are scattered, sharply pointed, up to 200 mm (7.9 in) long and 0.8–1.5 mm (0.031–0.059 in) wide and often resemble the branchlets. The flowers are arranged in racemes of up to three in upper leaf axils, the peduncle and rachis often obscured by bracts up to 3 mm (0.12 in) long, each flower on a pedicel 1–3 mm (0.039–0.118 in) long. The sepals are grey, 5–6 mm (0.20–0.24 in) long and joined at the base, the upper two lobes about 1.5 mm (0.059 in) long and the lower three about 2 mm (0.079 in) long. The standard petal is egg-shaped with a notch at the tip and turned back by more than 90°, about 9 mm (0.35 in) long, orange with a red base an intensely yellow centre. The wings are about 8 mm (0.31 in) long and dark red, and the keel about 5 mm (0.20 in) long and deep red. Flowering occurs from August to October and the fruit is a sticky, flattened triangular pod 12–14 mm (0.47–0.55 in) long.

== Taxonomy and naming ==
This taxon was first formally described in 1864 by George Bentham in Flora Australiensis and given the name Daviesia hakeoides var. major, based on material collected by George Maxwell on "granite hille north from Cape Paisley". In 1995, Michael Crisp raised the variety to species status as Daviesia major. The specific epithet (major) means "larger or taller".

== Distribution and habitat ==
This daviesia grows in heath with scattered eucalypts in sandy soil in near-coastal areas between Busselton and Israelite Bay in the Esperance Plains, Mallee and Swan Coastal Plain biogeographic regions of south-western Western Australia.

== Conservation status ==
Daviesia major is listed as "not threatened" by the Government of Western Australia Department of Biodiversity, Conservation and Attractions.
