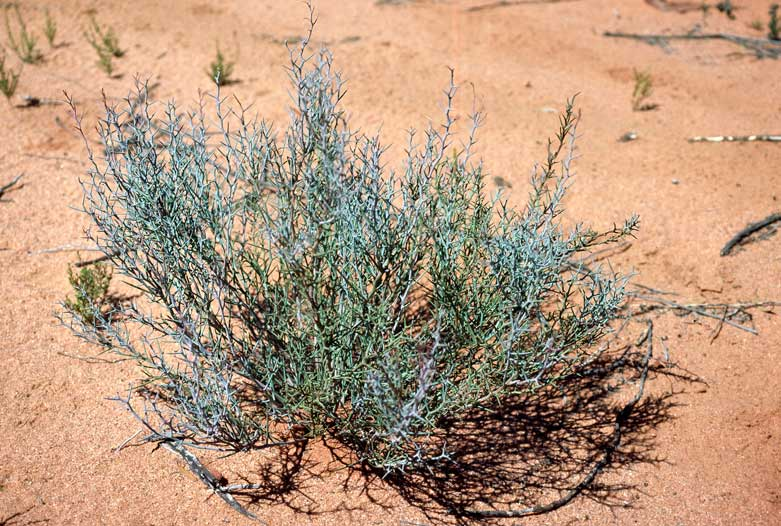
- Daviesia purpurascens near Coolgardie

Scientific classification
- Kingdom: Plantae
- Clade: Tracheophytes
- Clade: Angiosperms
- Clade: Eudicots
- Clade: Rosids
- Order: Fabales
- Family: Fabaceae
- Subfamily: Faboideae
- Genus: Daviesia
- Species: D. purpurascens

Binomial name
- Daviesia purpurascens Crisp

= Daviesia purpurascens =

Purple-leaved daviesia

Species of legume

Daviesia purpurascens, commonly known as purple-leaved daviesia, is a species of flowering plant in the family Fabaceae and is endemic to the south-west of Western Australia. It is a glabrous shrub with many branchlets, scattered, erect, cylindrical, sharply pointed phyllodes and yellow and maroon flowers.

== Description ==
Daviesia purpurascens is a glabrous shrub that typically grows to a height of about 1 m (3 ft 3 in) and has many erect, greyish to purplish branchlets. Its phyllodes are scattered, cylindrical, 5–50 mm (0.20–1.97 in) long and 0.7–1.5 mm (0.028–0.059 in) long and sharply pointed. The flowers are arranged in leaf axils in up to three groups of two to ten flowers on a peduncle 0.25–2 mm (0.0098–0.0787 in) long, the rachis up to 14 mm (0.55 in) wide, each flower on a pedicel 0.5–3 mm (0.020–0.118 in) long with spatula-shaped bracts 0.75–1.5 mm (0.030–0.059 in) long at the base. The sepals are 2.5–3.5 mm (0.098–0.138 in) long and joined at the base, the upper two lobes longer than the lower three. The standard petal is egg-shaped, 5.5–6.0 mm (0.22–0.24 in) long, 6–7 mm (0.24–0.28 in) wide, and yellow with a maroon base. The wings are 5.0–5.5 mm (0.20–0.22 in) long and maroon, the keel about 3 mm (0.12 in) long and maroon. Flowering occurs in August and September and the fruit is an inflated egg-shaped pod 4–6 mm (0.16–0.24 in) long.

== Taxonomy ==
Daviesia purpurascens was first formally described in 1995 by Michael Crisp in the Journal of the Adelaide Botanic Gardens from specimens collected near Bendering by Ian Brooker in 1979. The specific epithet (purpurascens) means "becoming purplish".

== Distribution and habitat ==
Purple-leaved daviesia grows in the shrub layer of mallee woodland in five disjunct populations in the Avon Wheatbelt, Coolgardie, Esperance Plains, Great Victoria Desert, Mallee and Murchison biogeographic region of south-western Western Australia.

== Conservation status ==
Daviesia purpurascens is listed as "not threatened" by the Government of Western Australia Department of Biodiversity, Conservation and Attractions,
