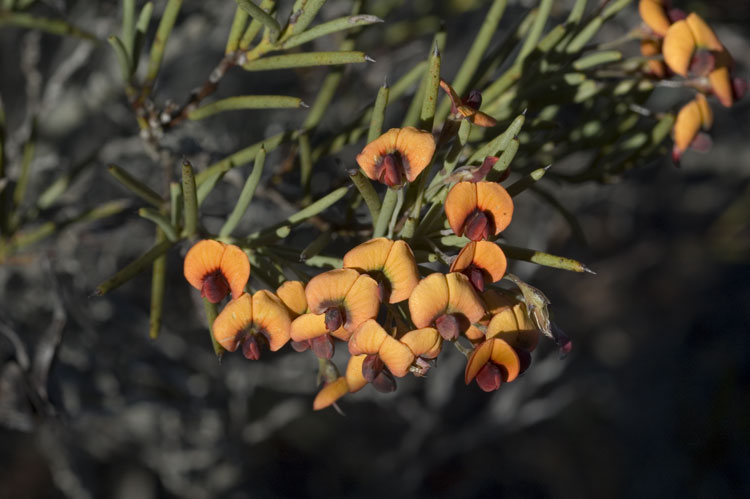
- Near Stokes Inlet

Scientific classification
- Kingdom: Plantae
- Clade: Tracheophytes
- Clade: Angiosperms
- Clade: Eudicots
- Clade: Rosids
- Order: Fabales
- Family: Fabaceae
- Subfamily: Faboideae
- Genus: Daviesia
- Species: D. teretifolia

Binomial name
- Daviesia teretifolia R.Br. ex Benth.

= Daviesia teretifolia =

Species of legume

Daviesia teretifolia is a species of flowering plant in the family Fabaceae and is endemic to the south coast of Western Australia. It is a spreading shrub with tapering cylindrical, sharply pointed phyllodes, and yellow to orange and dark red to black flowers.

== Description ==
Daviesia teretifolia is a spreading, glabrous, glaucous shrub that typically grows to a height of up to 1.2 m (3 ft 11 in). Its phyllodes are tapering cylindrical, upwards-pointing, 17–47 mm (0.67–1.85 in) long, 1.5–2 mm (0.059–0.079 in) wide and sharply pointed. The flowers are arranged in a group of three or four in leaf axils on a peduncle 2–7.5 mm (0.079–0.295 in) long, the rachis 2–7 mm (0.079–0.276 in) long, each flower on a pedicel 8–15 mm (0.31–0.59 in) long. The sepals are 4.5–5.5 mm (0.18–0.22 in) long and joined at the base, the two upper lobes joined for most of their length and the lower three lobes triangular. The standard petal is elliptic with a notched centre, 7.5–8.5 mm (0.30–0.33 in) long, 7.0–9.5 mm (0.28–0.37 in) wide and yellow to orange with a dark red to black centre. The wings are 7–8 mm (0.28–0.31 in) long and maroon, the keel 7.5–8 mm (0.30–0.31 in) long and maroon. Flowering occurs from May to October and the fruit is an inflated, triangular pod 13–16 mm (0.51–0.63 in) long.

== Taxonomy ==
Daviesia teretifolia was first formally described in 1864 by George Bentham in Flora Australiensis from an unpublished description by Robert Brown. The specific epithet (teretifolia) means "terete-leaved".

== Distribution and habitat ==
This daviesia grows in tall shrubland in near-coastal areas of southern Western Australia in the Esperance Plains and Mallee bioregions .

== Conservation status ==
Daviesia teretifolia is classified as "not threatened" by the Western Australian Government Department of Biodiversity, Conservation and Attractions.
