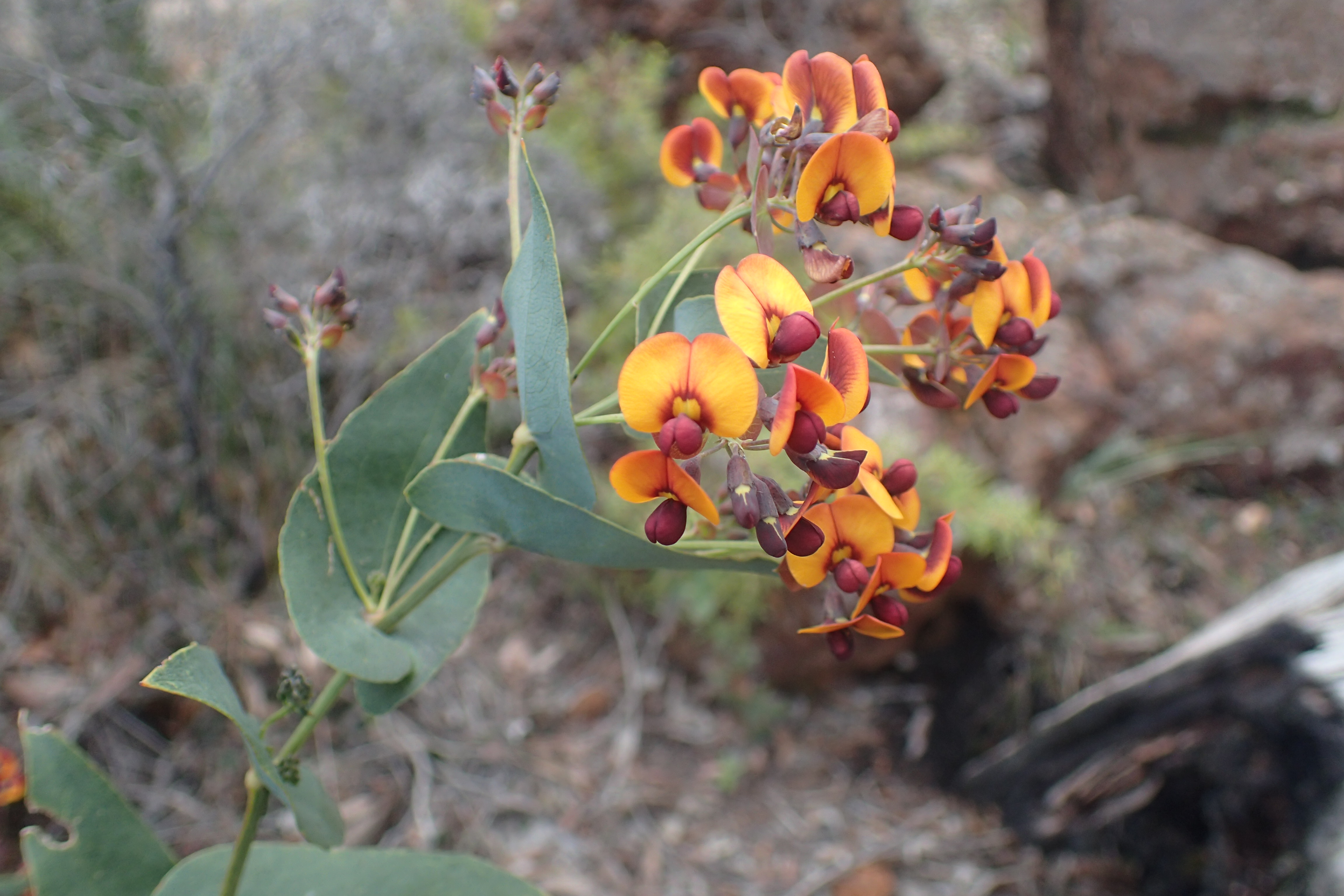
- Daviesia cordata near Collie

Scientific classification
- Kingdom: Plantae
- Clade: Tracheophytes
- Clade: Angiosperms
- Clade: Eudicots
- Clade: Rosids
- Order: Fabales
- Family: Fabaceae
- Subfamily: Faboideae
- Genus: Daviesia
- Species: D. cordata

Binomial name
- Daviesia cordata Sm.

Synonyms
- Mirbelia cordata (Sm.) Pritz.

= Daviesia cordata =

Bookleaf

Species of legume

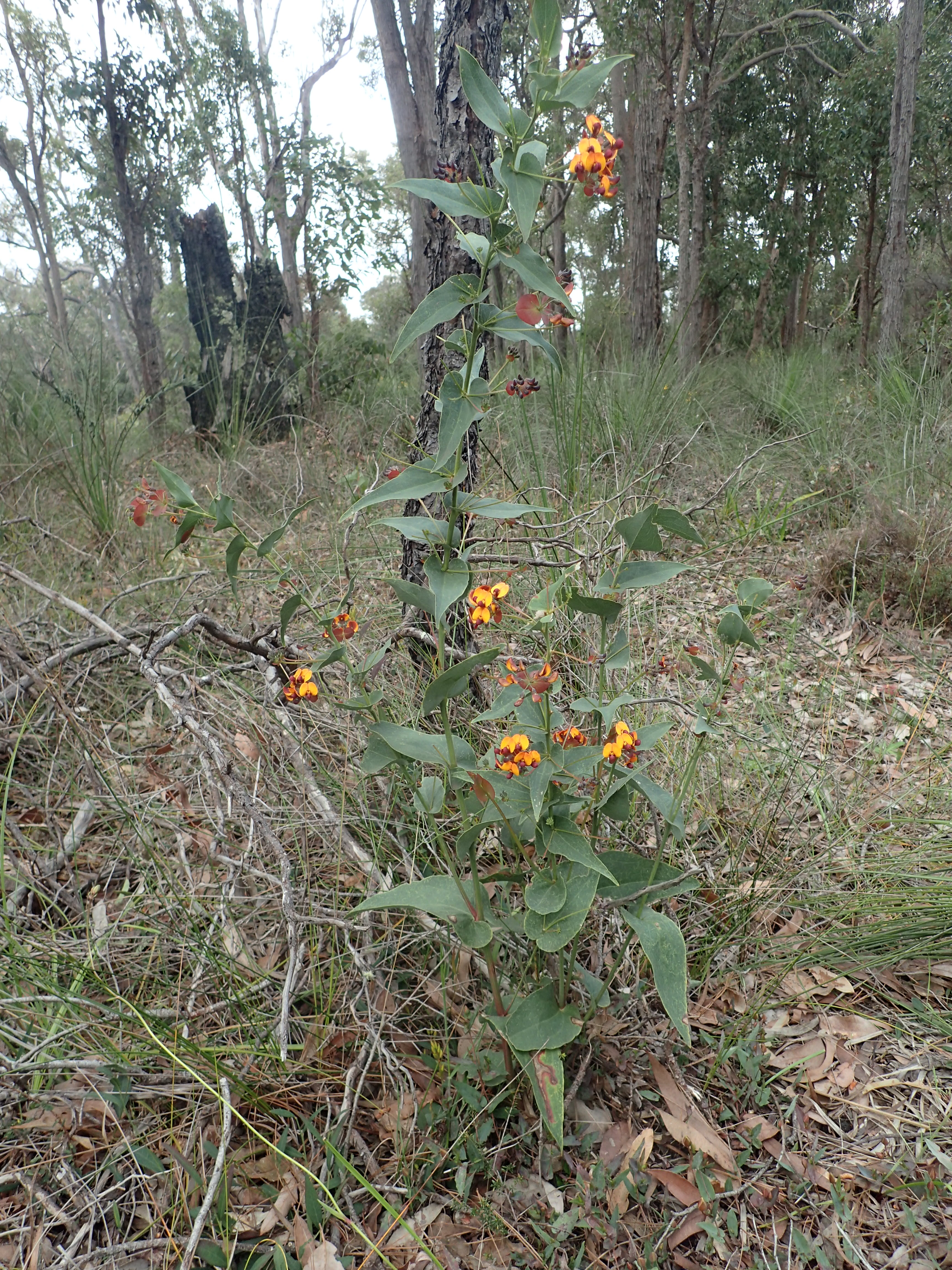
Habit

Daviesia cordata, commonly known as bookleaf, is a species of flowering plant in the family Fabaceae and is endemic to the south-west of Western Australia. It is a slender, erect shrub with scattered egg-shaped phyllodes, and yellow-orange and pinkish-purple flowers.

== Description ==
Daviesia cordata is a slender, erect, glabrous shrub that typically grows to a height of 0.5–1.2 m (1 ft 8 in – 3 ft 11 in). Its leaves are reduced to scattered, spreading, egg-shaped phyllodes 35–120 mm (1.4–4.7 in) long and 22–55 mm (0.87–2.17 in) wide, with a heart-shaped, stem-clasping base. The flowers are arranged in groups of ten to fifteen in leaf axils on a peduncle 20–70 mm (0.79–2.76 in) long, each flower on a pedicel 4.0–6.5 mm (0.16–0.26 in) long with two circular bracts 5–15 mm (0.20–0.59 in) wide at the base. The sepals are 6–7 mm (0.24–0.28 in) long and joined at the base, the upper lobes joined for most of their length and the lower three triangular and about 1.5 mm (0.059 in) long. The standard is yellow with orange at the base and tip, circular to elliptic, 10–12 mm (0.39–0.47 in) long and 6–9 mm (0.24–0.35 in) wide. The wings are pinkish-red to purple and 9.5–10.5 mm (0.37–0.41 in) long and the keel pinkish purple and 8–9 mm (0.31–0.35 in) long. Flowering occurs from July to December and the fruit is a flattened, triangular pod 12–16 mm (0.47–0.63 in) long.

== Taxonomy ==
Davieia cordata was first formally described in 1808 by James Edward Smith in The Cyclopaedia based on specimens collected from King George Sound. The specific epithet (cordata) mean "heart-shaped".

== Distribution and habitat ==
Bookleaf grows in open forest and mallee-heath and is common from near Perth to Albany in the Avon Wheatbelt, Jarrah Forest, Swan Coastal Plain and Warren biogeographic regions of south-western Western Australia.
