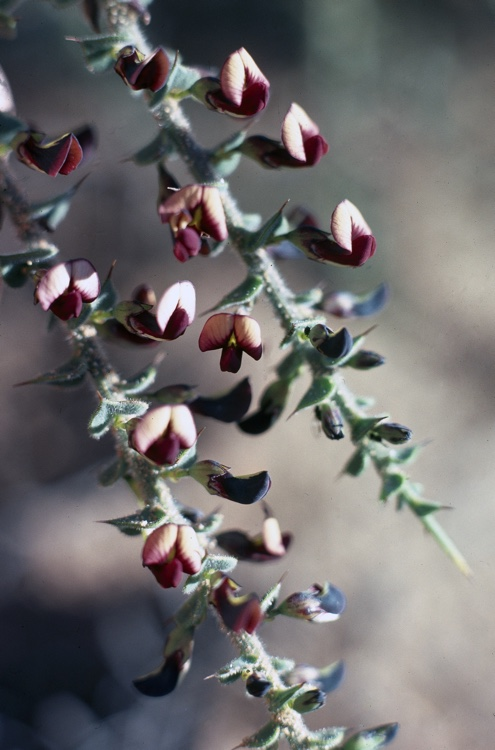
- Near Euston

Scientific classification
- Kingdom: Plantae
- Clade: Tracheophytes
- Clade: Angiosperms
- Clade: Eudicots
- Clade: Rosids
- Order: Fabales
- Family: Fabaceae
- Subfamily: Faboideae
- Genus: Daviesia
- Species: D. arenaria

Binomial name
- Daviesia arenaria Crisp

= Daviesia arenaria =

Sandhill bitter-pea

Species of flowering plant

Daviesia arenaria, commonly known as sandhill bitter-pea, is a species of flowering plant in the family Fabaceae and is endemic to south-eastern continental Australia. It is usually a hummock-forming shrub with many short, spiny branchlets and heart-shaped to elliptic phyllodes with a sharp point on the end, and orange-pink, maroon and yellow flowers.

== Description ==
Daviesia arenaria is usually a hummock-forming shrub that typically grows up to 1.5 m (4 ft 11 in) high and 2.5 m (8 ft 2 in) wide and has many short, spiny branchlets. Its leaves are reduced to heart-shaped to elliptic phyllodes that are v-shaped in cross-section, 2.5–10 mm (0.098–0.394 in) wide and 1.5–8 mm (0.059–0.315 in) wide with a sharply-pointed tip. The flowers are orange-pink with maroon and yellow markings, arranged singly or in pairs in leaf axils, each flower on a pedicel 2–3 mm (0.079–0.118 in) long with several egg-shaped bracts about 1 mm (0.039 in) long at the base. The five sepals are 3–4 mm (0.12–0.16 in) long with triangular lobes about 1 mm (0.039 in) long. The petals are orange-pink on the front, maroon on the back with a greenish-yellow line on both sides, the standard petal, wings and keel all 6–7 mm (0.24–0.28 in) long. Flowering mainly occurs from August to November and the fruit is a flattened triangular pod 6–7 mm (0.24–0.28 in) long.

== Taxonomy and naming ==
Daviesia arenaria was first formally described in 1980 by Michael Crisp in Journal of the Adelaide Botanic Gardens from specimens he collected 31.5 km (19.6 mi) west of Euston in 1979. The specific epithet (arenaria) means "growing in sand".

== Distribution and habitat ==
This species of pea mainly grows in mallee and is found in south-western New South Wales, western Victoria and south-eastern South Australia.
