= Daviesia pachyloma =

Scientific classification
- Kingdom: Plantae
- Clade: Tracheophytes
- Clade: Angiosperms
- Clade: Eudicots
- Clade: Rosids
- Order: Fabales
- Family: Fabaceae
- Subfamily: Faboideae
- Genus: Daviesia
- Species: D. pachyloma

Binomial name
- Daviesia pachyloma Turcz.

Species of flowering plant

Daviesia pachyloma is a species of flowering plant in the family Fabaceae and is endemic to the south-west of Western Australia. It is an erect, bushy or spreading shrub with zigzagging branches, sharply-pointed, narrowly elliptic to linear phyllodes, and yellow and red flowers.

== Description ==
Daviesia pachyloma is an erect, bushy or spreading shrub that typically grows to a height of up to about 50 cm (20 in) and has more or less glabrous, zigzagging branches. Its phyllodes are scattered, erect and narrowly elliptic to linear, 8–65 mm (0.31–2.56 in) long and 1–2 mm (0.039–0.079 in) wide with a sharply pointed tip and thickened edges. The flowers are arranged singly in leaf axils on a peduncle up to 2.5 mm (0.098 in) long, with up to five leaf-like bracts at the base, the rachis up to 1.5 mm (0.059 in) long. Each flower is on a pedicel 1–4 mm (0.039–0.157 in) long, the sepals 5–6 mm (0.20–0.24 in) long and joined at the base with triangular lobes 2–3 mm (0.079–0.118 in) long. The standard petal is egg-shaped with a notched centre, 6–10 mm (0.24–0.39 in) long and 6.0–7.5 mm (0.24–0.30 in) wide, and yellow with a red border and fine red veins, the wings about 6–8 mm (0.24–0.31 in) long and yellow, the keel 7–7.5 mm (0.28–0.30 in) long and pale creamy yellow. Flowering occurs from March to January and the fruit is a flattened, triangular pod about 8 mm (0.31 in) long.

== Taxonomy and naming ==
Daviesia pachyloma was first formally described in 1853 by Nikolai Turczaninow in the Bulletin de la Société Impériale des Naturalistes de Moscou. The specific epithet (pachyloma) means "thick hem", referring to the edge of the phyllodes.

The original publication gave the name Daviesia pachylima, a transcription error from Turczaninow's handwriting. The epithet pachylina has no etymological meaning, and may explain why George Bentham changed the spelling to pachylina ("thick thread") in Flora Australiensis.

== Distribution and habitat ==
This daviesia grows in scattered populations in woodland between Manmanning, Zanthus, Kulin and Holt Rock in the Avon Wheatbelt, Coolgardie, Great Victoria Desert and Mallee biogeographic regions of south-western Western Australia.

== Conservation status ==
Daviesia pachyloma is listed as "not threatened" by the Government of Western Australia Department of Biodiversity, Conservation and Attractions.
