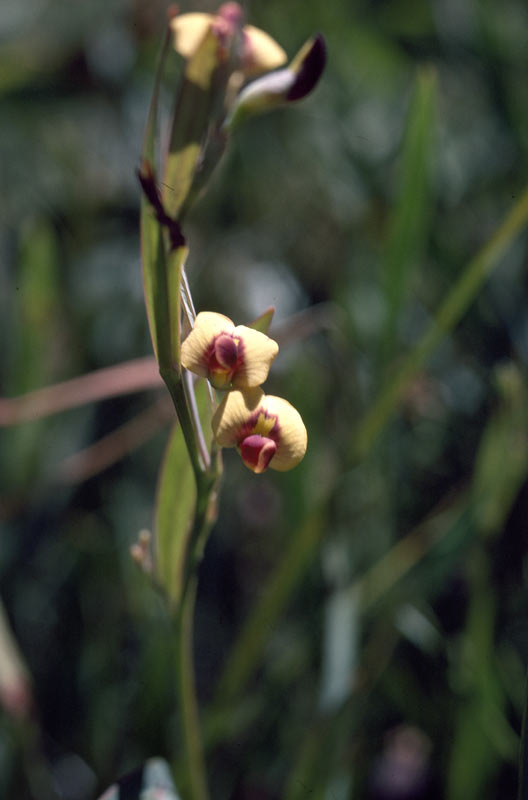
- Near Busselton

Conservation status
- Vulnerable (EPBC Act)

Scientific classification
- Kingdom: Plantae
- Clade: Tracheophytes
- Clade: Angiosperms
- Clade: Eudicots
- Clade: Rosids
- Order: Fabales
- Family: Fabaceae
- Subfamily: Faboideae
- Genus: Daviesia
- Species: D. elongata

Binomial name
- Daviesia elongata Benth.

= Daviesia elongata =

Species of legume

Daviesia elongata is a species of flowering plant in the family Fabaceae and is endemic to the south-west of Western Australia. It is a glabrous, spreading or sprawling shrub with narrowly egg-shaped to linear phyllodes and yellow-orange and maroon flowers.

== Description ==
Daviesia elongata is a glabrous, spreading or sprawling shrub that typically grows to a height of 0.5–1 m (1 ft 8 in – 3 ft 3 in) and up to 1 m (3 ft 3 in) wide. Its phyllodes are narrowly egg-shaped with the narrower end towards the base to linear, 40–170 mm (1.6–6.7 in) long and 4–15 mm (0.16–0.59 in) wide with a prominent mid-vein. The flowers are arranged in groups of two or three in leaf axils on a peduncle 8–12 mm (0.31–0.47 in) long, the rachis 1–2 mm (0.039–0.079 in), each flower on a pedicel 2–7.5 mm (0.079–0.295 in) long with triangular bracts about 1 mm (0.039 in) long. The sepals are 5.5–7.0 mm (0.22–0.28 in) long and joined at the base, upper two lobes joined for most of their length, the lower three about 0.75 mm (0.030 in) long and triangular. The standard petal is elliptic, 10–11.5 mm (0.39–0.45 in) long, 8–12 mm (0.31–0.47 in) wide and yellow or yellow-orange with a red base and a notched tip. The wings are 8.5–11 mm (0.33–0.43 in) long and maroon, and the keel is about 6.5 mm (0.26 in) long and maroon. Flowering occurs from September to January and the fruit is a flattened triangular pod 15–17 mm (0.59–0.67 in) long.

== Taxonomy ==
Daviesia elongata was first formally described in 1864 by George Bentham in Flora Australiensis. The specific epithet (elongata) means "lengthened", referring to the phyllodes.

In 1995, Michael Crisp described two subspecies in Australian Systematic Botany, but only the name of the autonym is accepted by the Australian Plant Census:

- Daviesia elongata Benth. subsp. elongata;
- Daviesia elongata subsp. implexa Crisp.

== Distribution and habitat ==
This species of pea grows in the heathy understorey of forest near Carbunup and Busselton.

== Conservation status ==
Daviesia elongata subsp. elongata is listed as "vulnerable" under the Australian Government Environment Protection and Biodiversity Conservation Act 1999 and as "Threatened Flora (Declared Rare Flora — Extant)" by the Department of Biodiversity, Conservation and Attractions. The main threats to the species include disturbance during road maintenance, inappropriate fire regimes and weed invasion.
