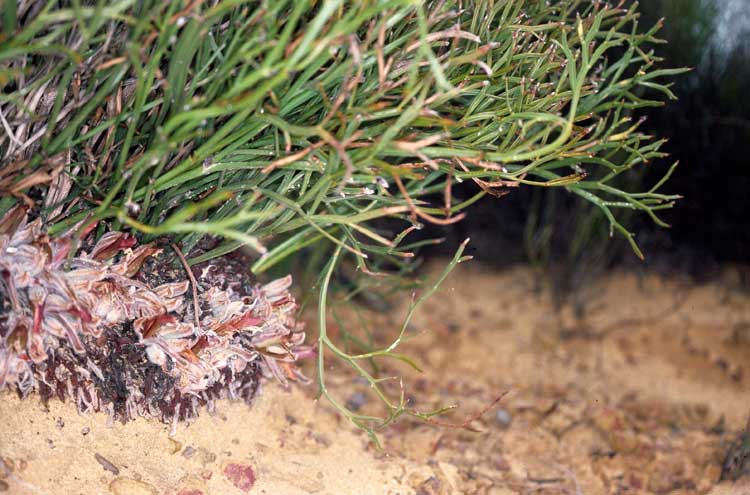
- East of Southern Cross

Scientific classification
- Kingdom: Plantae
- Clade: Tracheophytes
- Clade: Angiosperms
- Clade: Eudicots
- Clade: Rosids
- Order: Fabales
- Family: Fabaceae
- Subfamily: Faboideae
- Genus: Leptosema
- Species: L. cervicornu

Binomial name
- Leptosema cervicornu Crisp

= Leptosema cervicornu =

Species of legume

Leptosema cervicornu is a species of flowering plant in the family Fabaceae and is endemic to inland areas of Western Australia. It is a shrub with many tangled branches and branchlets, leaves reduced to egg-shaped scales, green flowers sometimes with a red tinge, and beaked broadly oval pods.

== Description ==
Leptosema cervicornu is a shrub with many tangled branches and branchlets, and that typically grows to up to 45 cm (18 in) high and 8 cm (3.1 in) wide. Its leaves are reduced to egg-shaped, dark red scales, up to 5 mm (0.20 in) long. The flowers are densely packed, red, resupinate, and borne in densely packed rosettes, each flower on a pedicel up to 10 mm (0.39 in) long on a rhachis up to 70 mm (2.8 in) long with egg-shaped bracts about 5–6 mm (0.20–0.24 in) long. The sepals are 25–32 mm (0.98–1.26 in) long and form a tube 4–5 mm (0.16–0.20 in) long. The petals are greenish, sometimes with a red tinge, the standard petal is enclosed in the sepals, 18–20 mm (0.71–0.79 in) long and 4.5 mm (0.18 in) broad, the wings are linear, 28–30 mm (1.1–1.2 in) long and about 4 mm (0.16 in) wide with the keel protruding and 30–34 mm (1.2–1.3 in) long. The ovary is more or less sessile with about 45 ovules. The pods are very broadly oval, 10–13 mm (0.39–0.51 in) long and 7–10 mm (0.28–0.39 in) wide including a beak 2–4 mm (0.079–0.157 in) long, containing a single striated seed.

== Taxonomy ==
Leptosema cervicornu was first formally described in 1999 by Michael Crisp in Australian Systematic Botany from specimens collected 69 km (43 mi) east of Southern Cross in 1980. The specific epithet (cervicornu) means 'deer- or stag-horn', referring to the branching pattern of the plant.

In the original description, the specific epithet was spelled cervicorne but in 2019, Alex George suggested that the required nominative or ablative case is cervicornu. In 2020, the epithet was corrected to cervicornu.

== Distribution and habitat ==
This species of Leptosema grows in heath with Eucalyptus species, Allocasuarina campestris, Callitris and proteaceous shrubs and is found from the Western Australian Goldfields near Menzies to Southern Cross and towards Norseman in the Coolgardie and Murchison bioregions of inland Western Australia.

== Conservation status ==
Leptosema cervicornu is listed as "not threatened" by the Government of Western Australia Department of Biodiversity, Conservation and Attractions.
