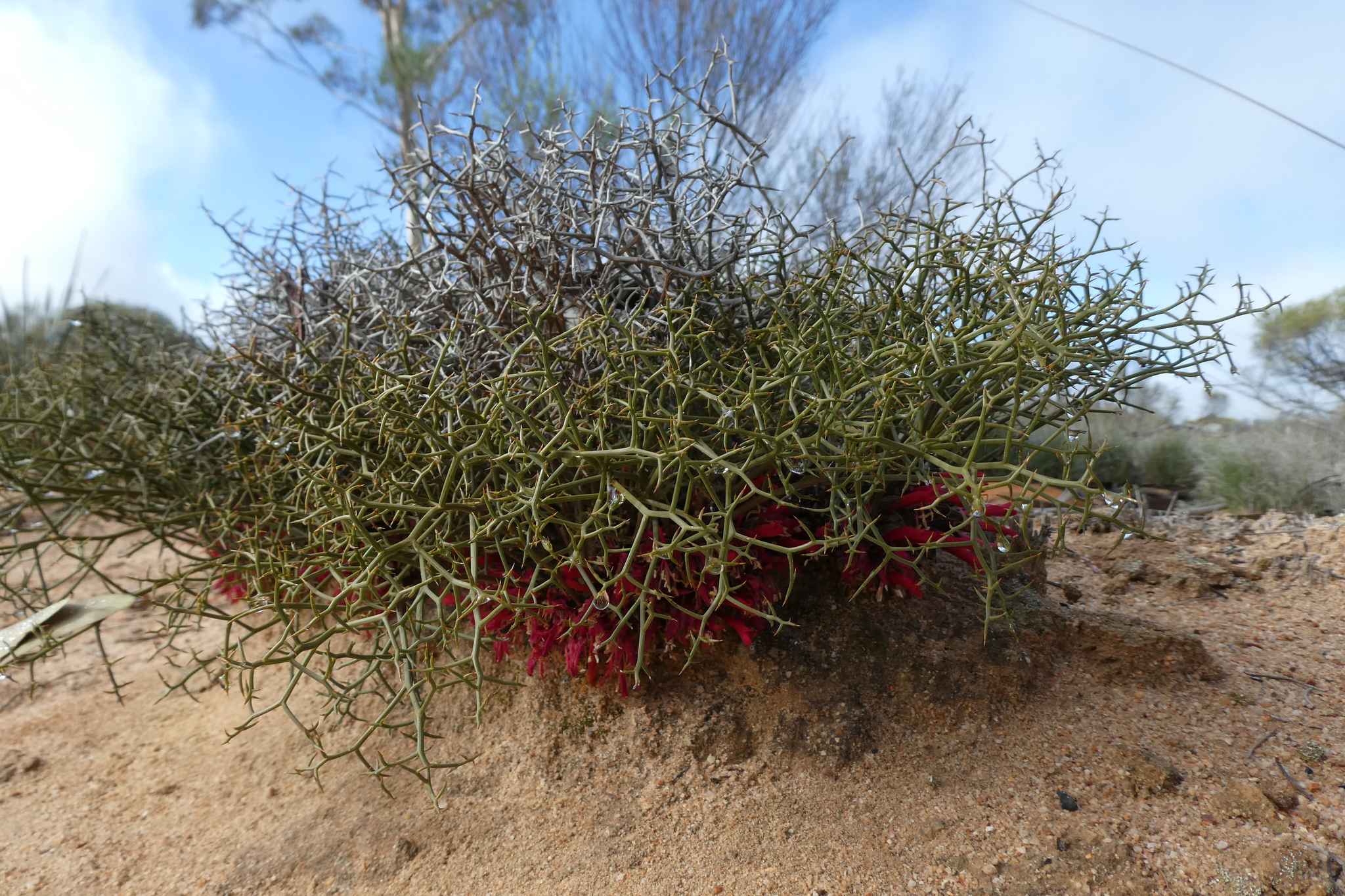
- Near Merredin

Scientific classification
- Kingdom: Plantae
- Clade: Embryophytes
- Clade: Tracheophytes
- Clade: Spermatophytes
- Clade: Angiosperms
- Clade: Eudicots
- Clade: Rosids
- Order: Fabales
- Family: Fabaceae
- Subfamily: Faboideae
- Genus: Leptosema
- Species: L. daviesioides

Binomial name
- Leptosema daviesioides (Turcz.) Crisp

Synonyms
- Brachysema daviesioides (Turcz.) Benth.; Kaleniczenkia daviesioides Turcz.

= Leptosema daviesioides =

Species of legume

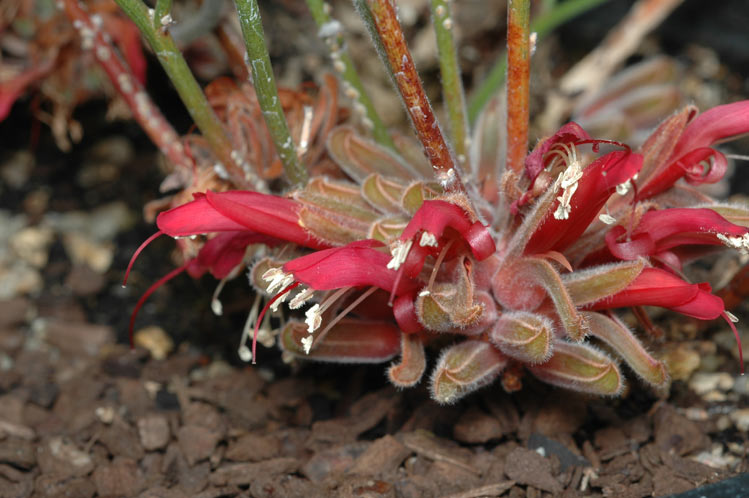
Flowers in the ANBG

Leptosema daviesioides is a species of flowering plant in the family Fabaceae and is endemic to the south-west of Western Australia. It is a shrub with many rigid, spiny branches, leaves reduced to triangular scales, deep pink flowers, and beaked, very broadly oval pods.

== Description ==
Leptosema daviesioides is a prostrate or erect, widely branched shrub that typically grows to a height of 5–30 cm (2.0–11.8 in) and has many intricate, rigid, spiny branches. Its adult leaves are reduced to scales 0.5–1.5 mm (0.020–0.059 in) long and fused to the stem. The flowers are densely packed, resupinate, and borne in densely packed rosettes at the base of the plant, each flower 28–35 mm (1.1–1.4 in) long on a pedicel 2–15 mm (0.079–0.591 in) long on a rhachis 20–30 mm (0.79–1.18 in) long with egg-shaped bracteoles about 3 mm (0.12 in) long. The sepals are pink and curved back, so that the flower gapes. The petals are red or pink, the standard petal enclosed in the sepals, 9–10 mm (0.35–0.39 in) long, the wings protruding, linear, about 33 mm (1.3 in) long and 2.5 mm (0.098 in) wide and the keel protruding, about 35 mm (1.4 in) long. The ovary is more or less sessile with 30 to 35 ovules. The pods are broadly oval, 10–18 mm (0.39–0.71 in) long and 7–10 mm (0.28–0.39 in) wide including the beak.

== Taxonomy ==
This species was first formally described in 1853 by Nikolai Turczaninow who gave it the name Kaleniczenkia daviesioides in the Bulletin de la Société impériale des naturalistes de Moscou from specimens collected by James Drummond. In 1987, Michael Crisp transferred the species to Leptosema as L. davesioides in the Journal of the Adelaide Botanic Gardens. The specific epithet (daviesioides) means 'Daviesia-like'.

== Distribution and habitat ==
Leptosema daviesioides grows in a variety of soil types and habitats, but usually sand, often in heath with Allocasuarina campestris and Melaleuca, between the Murchison River, Lake Grace and west to Balladonia and Cundeelee.

== Conservation status ==
Leptosema daviesioides is listed as "not threatened" by the Government of Western Australia Department of Biodiversity, Conservation and Attractions.

Leptosema daviesioides

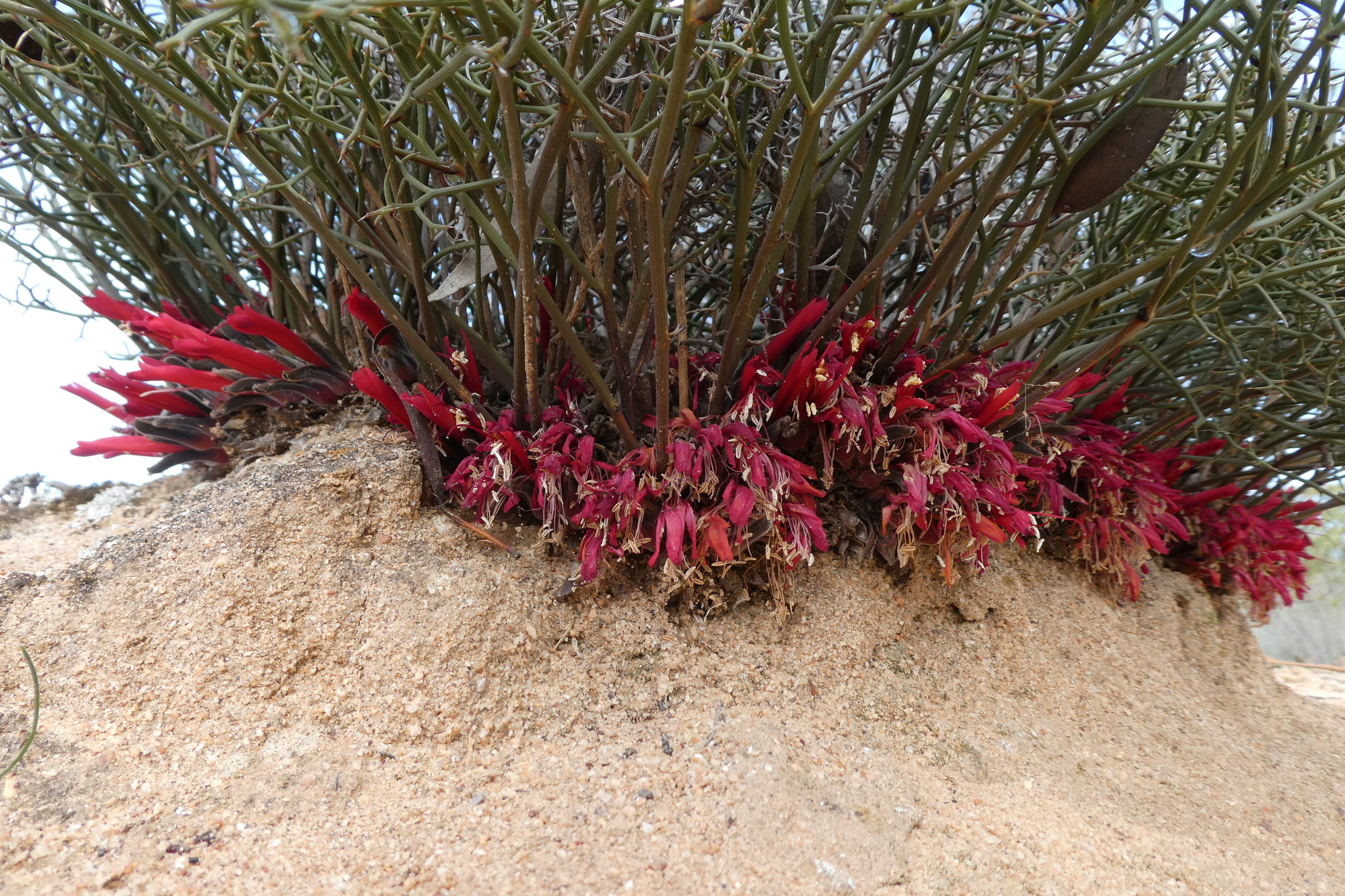

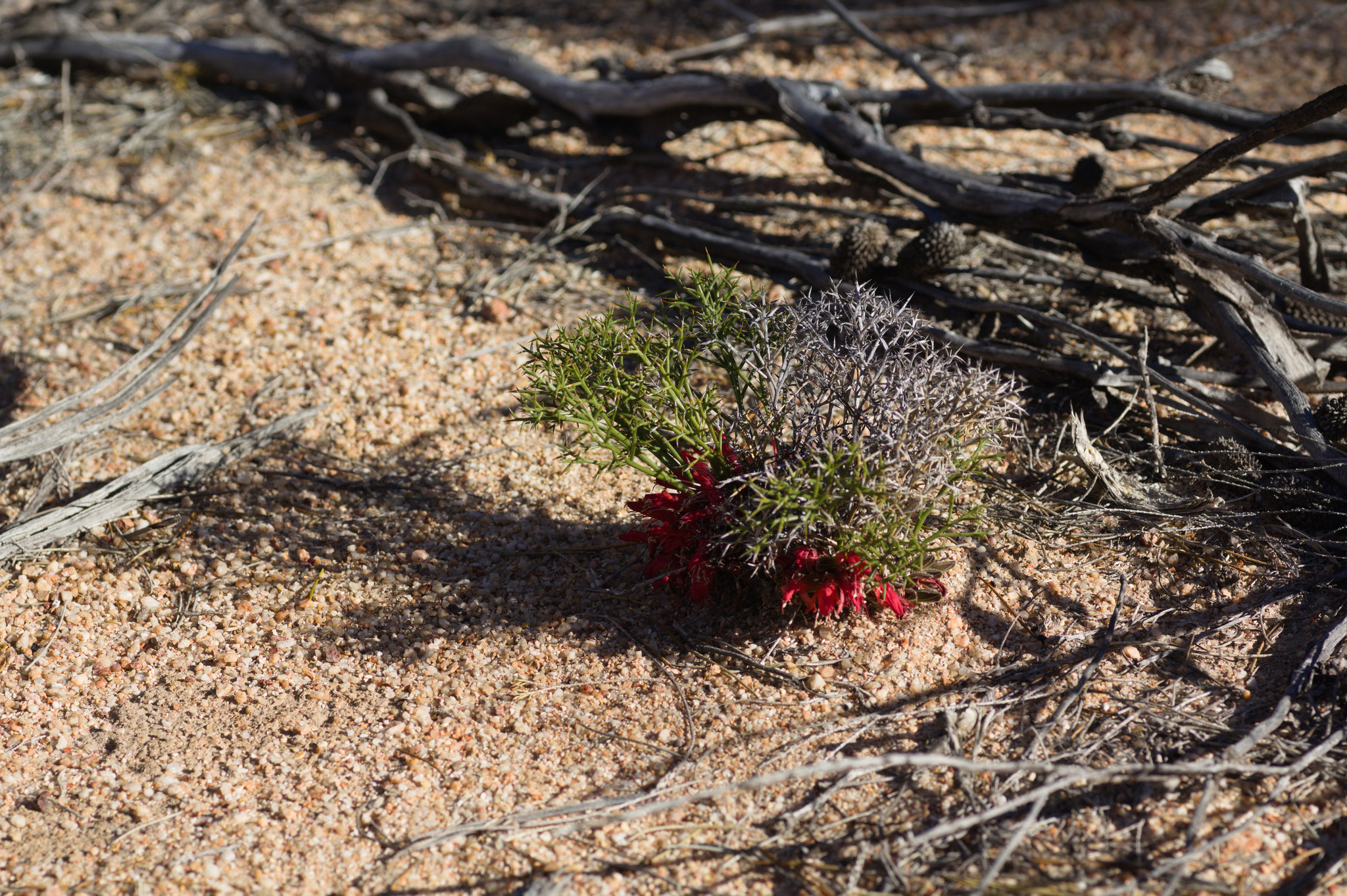

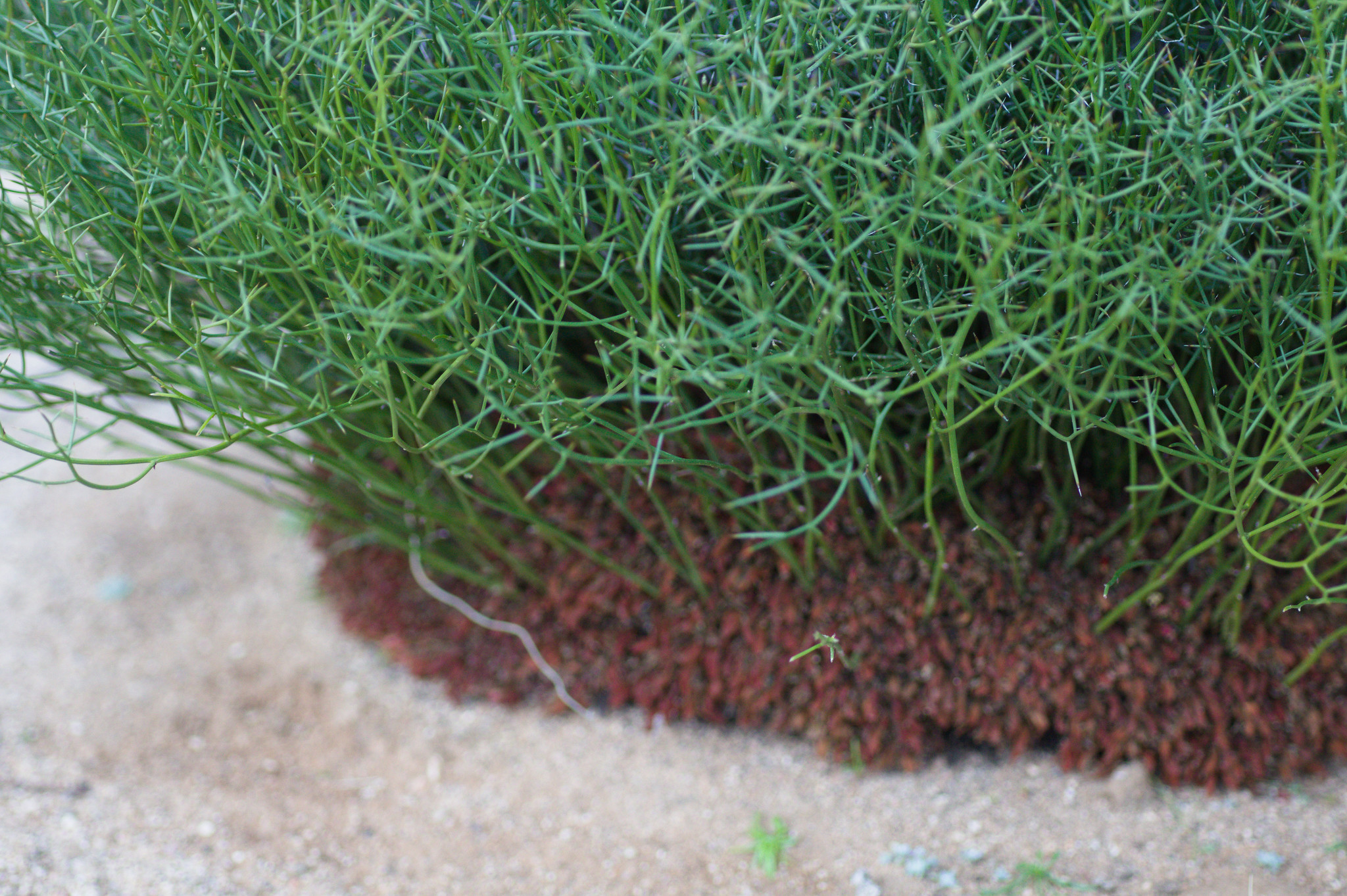

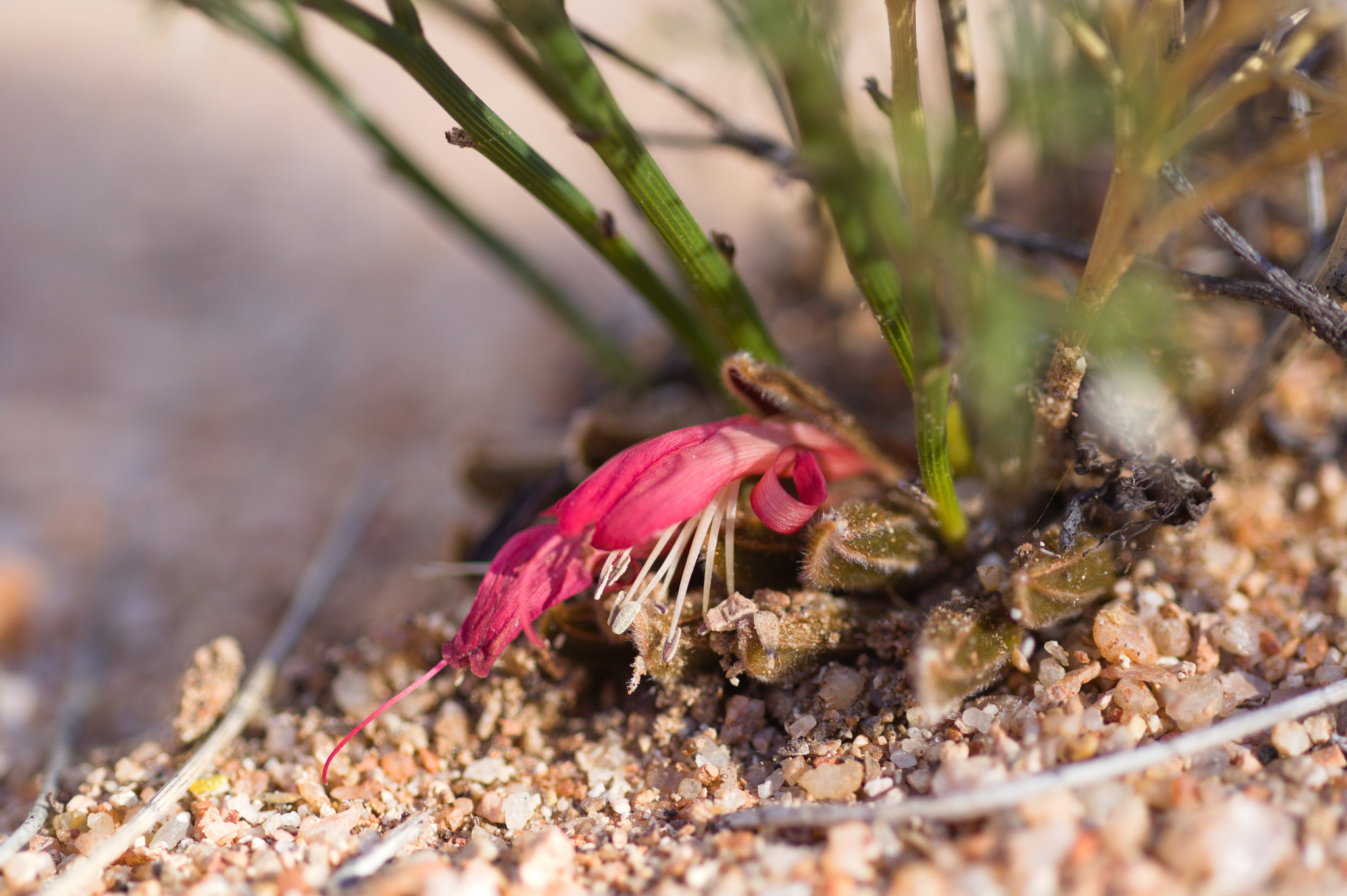
