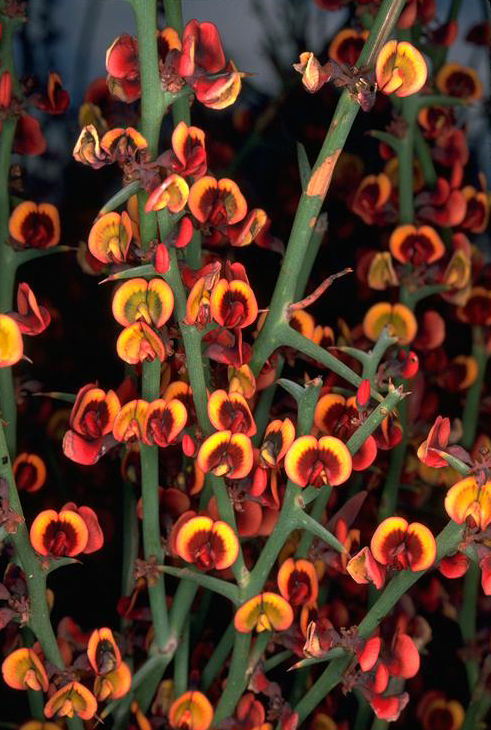
- Subspecies intricata near Quairading

Scientific classification
- Kingdom: Plantae
- Clade: Tracheophytes
- Clade: Angiosperms
- Clade: Eudicots
- Clade: Rosids
- Order: Fabales
- Family: Fabaceae
- Subfamily: Faboideae
- Genus: Daviesia
- Species: D. intricata

Binomial name
- Daviesia intricata Crisp

= Daviesia intricata =

Species of flowering plant

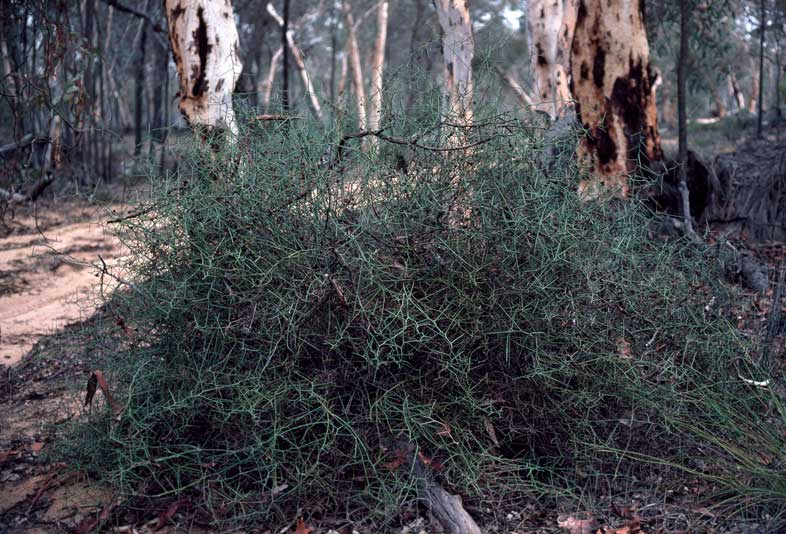
Habit

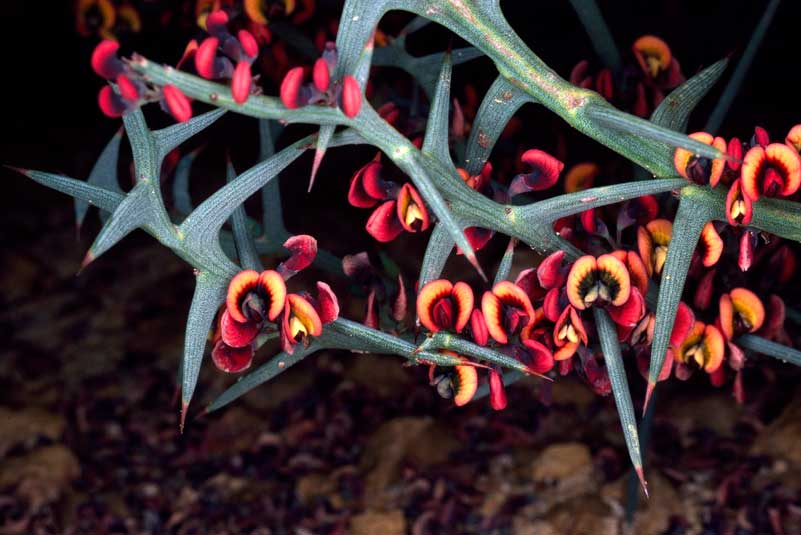
Subspecies xiphophylla

Daviesia intricata is a species of flowering plant in the family Fabaceae and is endemic to the south-west of Western Australia. It is a glabrous shrub with densely tangled branches, sharply-pointed, needle-shaped or flattened phyllodes and apricot-yellow and dark red flowers.

== Description ==
Daviesia intricata is a glabrous shrub that typically grows to a height of up to 2 m (6 ft 7 in), and has densely tangled branches. Its phyllodes are mainly confined to near the ends of branchlets, sharply-pointed, needle-shaped, mostly 20–40 mm (0.79–1.57 in) long, 1.5–2.0 mm (0.059–0.079 in) wide and needle-shaped or flattened, depending on subspecies. The flowers are arranged in clusters of three to seven in leaf axils on a peduncle 0.5–1.0 mm (0.020–0.039 in) long, the rachis 1–5 mm (0.039–0.197 in) long, each flower on a pedicel 1–3 mm (0.039–0.118 in) long. The sepals are 1.5–2.5 mm (0.059–0.098 in) long and joined at the base, the lower three lobes longer than the upper two. The standard petal is elliptic with a notched tip, 4.5–5.5 mm (0.18–0.22 in) long and apricot yellow with a reddish-black centre, the wings 4.5–5.0 mm (0.18–0.20 in) long and dark red, and the keel 4–5 mm (0.16–0.20 in) long and dark red. Flowering occurs from May to August and the fruit is broadly triangular, slightly inflated pod 7–10 mm (0.28–0.39 in) long.

== Taxonomy and naming ==
Daviesia intricata was first formally described in 1995 by Michael Crisp in Australian Systematic Botany from specimens he collected in Tutanning Reserve near Pingelly in 1980. The specific epithet (intricata) means "entangled", referring to the habit of this species.

In the same journal article, Crisp described two subspecies, and the names are accepted by the Australian Plant Census:

- Daviesia intricata Crisp subsp. intricata;
- Daviesia intricata subsp. xiphophylla Crisp is a smaller (up to 50 cm (20 in) tall) plant than the autonym and has phyllodes that are vertically flattened, rather than needle-shaped.

== Distribution and habitat ==
Subspecies intricata grows in woodland, mallee, heathland and shrubland between the Charles Gardner Reserve near Tammin, Dumbleyung and Ravensthorpe and subsp. xiphophylla is found in heathland and mallee scrub from near Southern Cross to Marble Rocks east of Hyden.

== Conservation status ==
Both subspecies of D. intricata are listed as "not threatened" by the Department of Biodiversity, Conservation and Attractions.
