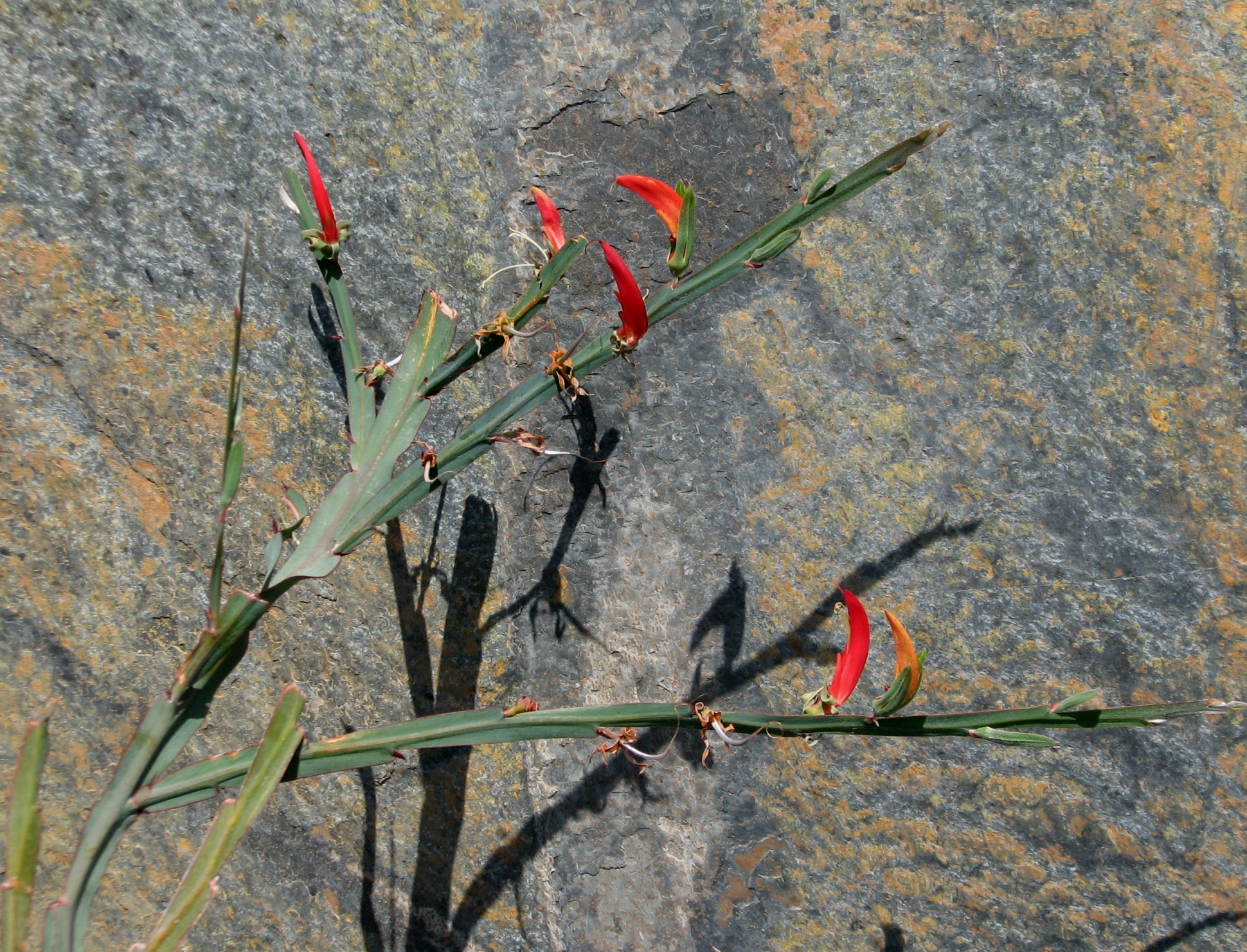
- Cultivated in the Royal Botanic Gardens, Cranbourne

Scientific classification
- Kingdom: Plantae
- Clade: Tracheophytes
- Clade: Angiosperms
- Clade: Eudicots
- Clade: Rosids
- Order: Fabales
- Family: Fabaceae
- Subfamily: Faboideae
- Genus: Leptosema
- Species: L. aphyllum

Binomial name
- Leptosema aphyllum (Hook.) Crisp

Synonyms
- Brachysema aphyllum Hook.; Burgesia homaloclada F.Muell.; Templetonia regina J.Drumm.

= Leptosema aphyllum =

Species of legume

Leptosema aphyllum is a species of flowering plant in the family Fabaceae and is endemic to semi-arid regions of Western Australia. It is a prostrate or low-lying shrub or subshrub with flat, wavy, winged stems and branches, leaves reduced to narrowly triangular scales that fall off, red flowers, and linear, beaked pods.

== Description ==
Leptosema aphyllum is a prostrate or low-lying shrub or subshrub, sometimes an erect shrub up to 1.5 m (4 ft 11 in) tall, its stems and branches flat, wavy and winged, 3–15 mm (0.12–0.59 in) wide. Its adult leaves are reduced to narrowly triangular scales, 4–10 mm (0.16–0.39 in) long but that fall off as they mature. The flowers are red, resupinate, and borne in the axils of the current season's branchlets on pedicels 5–10 mm (0.20–0.39 in) long. The sepals are linear, up to 25–30 mm (0.98–1.18 in) long. The standard petal is mostly enclosed in the sepals, 8–10.5 mm (0.31–0.41 in) long and 4–5 mm (0.16–0.20 in) broad, the wings are narrowly egg-shaped, 18–21 mm (0.71–0.83 in) long and 4 mm (0.16 in) wide and the keel is narrowly elliptic, 30–45 mm (1.2–1.8 in) long. The ovary densely covered with silky hairs and has 50 or more ovules. Flowering occurs between May and September, and the pods are linear to cylindrical, narrowed at both ends, 35–65 mm (1.4–2.6 in) long and 5–8 mm (0.20–0.31 in) wide and densely covered with silky hairs, with a beak 5–8 mm (0.20–0.31 in) long.

== Taxonomy ==
This species was first formally described in 1849 by William Jackson Hooker, who gave it the name Brachysema aphyllum in his Botanical Magazine, from dried specimens and a coloured drawing by James Drummond in the Swan River Colony. In 1999, Michael Crisp transferred the species to Leptosema as L. aphyllum in Australian Systematic Botany. The specific epithet (aphyllum) means 'without leaves'.

== Distribution and habitat ==
This species of Leptosema grows in semi-arid regions in woodland or shrubland in the Avon Wheatbelt, Carnarvon, Coolgardie, Geraldton Sandplains, Murchison and Yalgoo bioregions of mostly inland Western Australia.

== Conservation status ==
Jacksonia aphyllum is listed as "not threatened" by the Government of Western Australia Department of Biodiversity, Conservation and Attractions.
