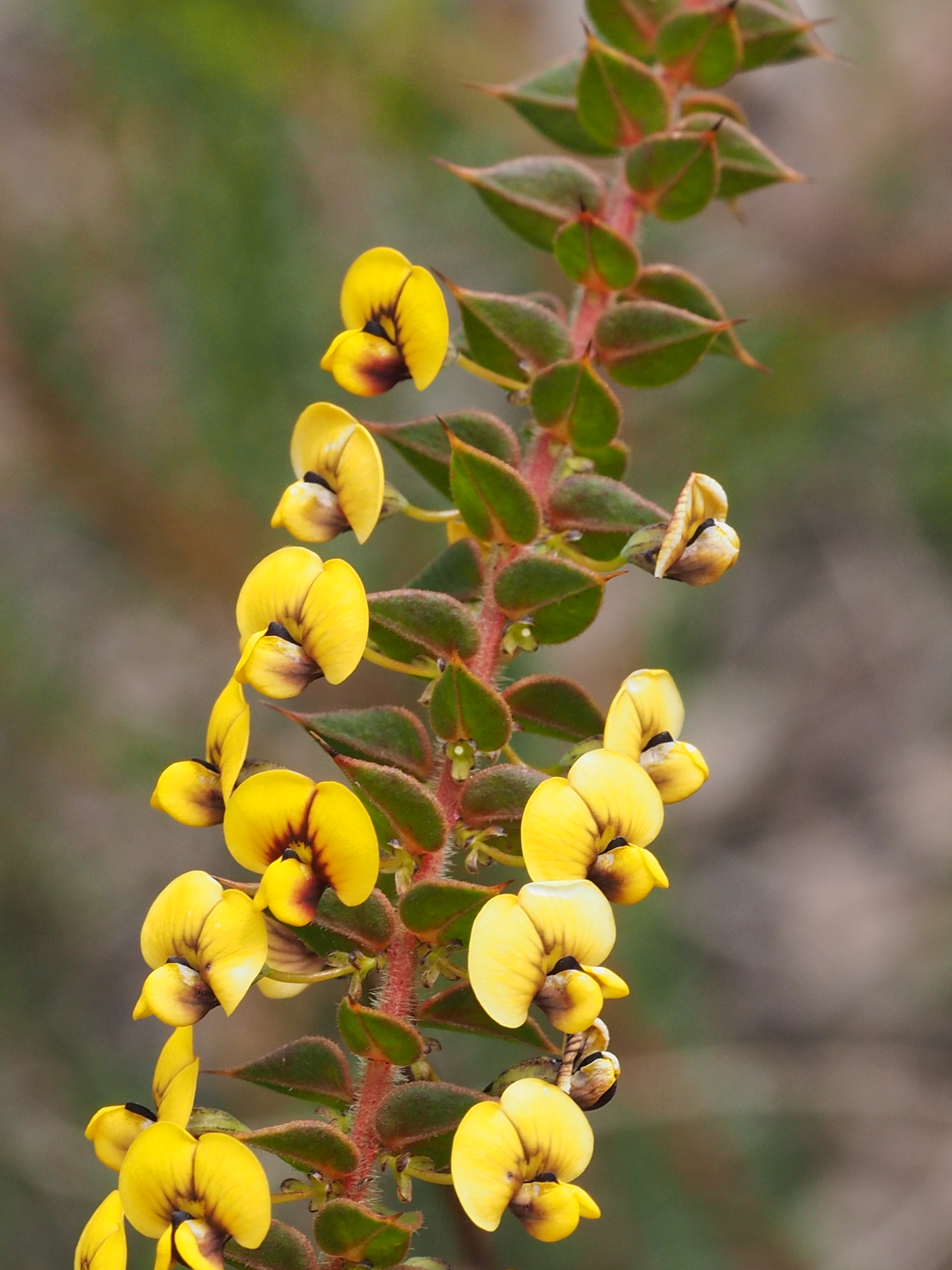
- In the Gibraltar Range National Park

Scientific classification
- Kingdom: Plantae
- Clade: Tracheophytes
- Clade: Angiosperms
- Clade: Eudicots
- Clade: Rosids
- Order: Fabales
- Family: Fabaceae
- Subfamily: Faboideae
- Genus: Daviesia
- Species: D. nova-anglica

Binomial name
- Daviesia nova-anglica Crisp

= Daviesia nova-anglica =

Species of flowering plant

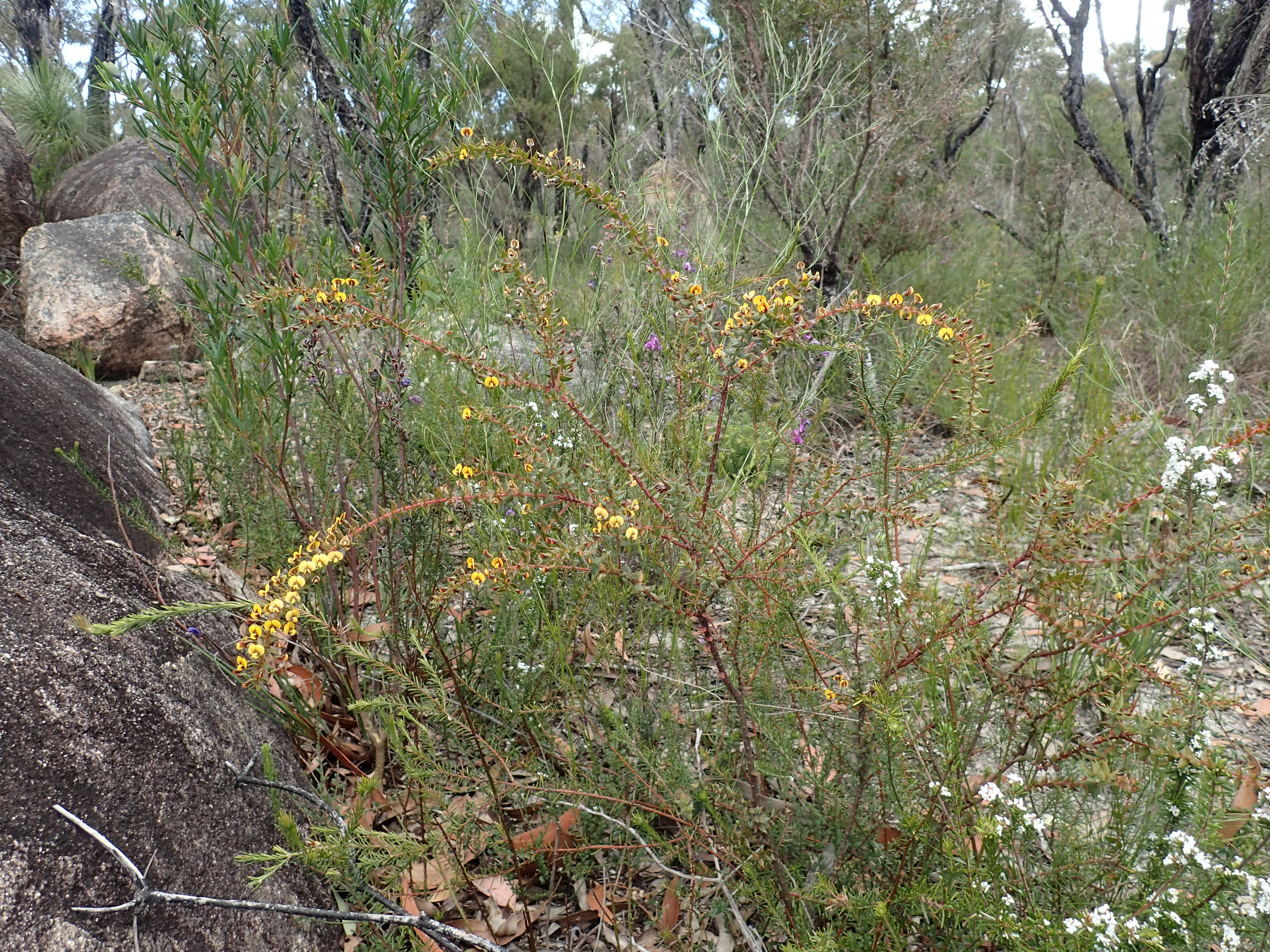
Habit

Daviesia nova-anglica is a species of flowering plant in the family Fabaceae and is endemic to northern New South Wales. It is an erect shrub with arching branches, sharply-pointed, egg-shaped to narrow egg-shaped phyllodes, and yellow flowers with red markings.

== Description ==
Daviesia nova-anglica is an erect shrub that typically grows to a height of up to 2 m (6 ft 7 in) and has arching branches and hairy branchlets. The phyllodes are sharply-pointed, egg-shaped to narrow egg-shaped, 5–12 mm (0.20–0.47 in) long and 2.5–6 mm (0.098–0.236 in) wide. The flowers are usually arranged singly on a peduncle 0.8–4.0 mm (0.031–0.157 in) long with bracts 1.0–1.5 mm (0.039–0.059 in) long at the base. The five sepals are 2.5–3.0 mm (0.098–0.118 in) long and joined at the base, the two upper lobes more or less fused and the lower three triangular. The petals are yellow with red or maroon markings, the standard petal 6–7 mm (0.24–0.28 in) long, the wings 5.5–6.5 mm (0.22–0.26 in) long and the keel sac-like and about 5 mm (0.20 in) long. Flowering occurs from August to October and the fruit is a flattened pod 6.5–8 mm (0.26–0.31 in) long.

== Taxonomy and naming ==
Daviesia nova-anglica was first formally described in 1990 by Michael Crisp in the journal Australian Systematic Botany from specimens collected east of Tenterfield in 1984.

== Distribution ==
This species of pea mainly grows in sandy soil, usually derived from granite, in open forest with a scrubby understorey. It mainly occurs on the Northern Tablelands of New South Wales.
