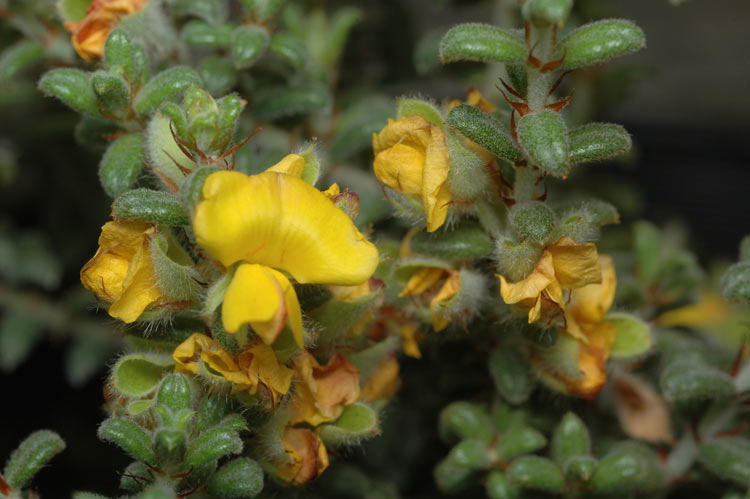
- In the Australian National Botanic Gardens

Scientific classification
- Kingdom: Plantae
- Clade: Tracheophytes
- Clade: Angiosperms
- Clade: Eudicots
- Clade: Rosids
- Order: Fabales
- Family: Fabaceae
- Subfamily: Faboideae
- Genus: Pultenaea
- Species: P. elachista

Binomial name
- Pultenaea elachista (F.Muell.) Crisp

Synonyms
- Gastrolobium elachistum F.Muell.; Pultenaea cymbifolia J.M.Black; Pultenaea sp. Clyde Hill K.R.Newbey 8236) WA Herbarium

= Pultenaea elachista =

Species of flowering plant

Pultenaea elachista is a species of flowering plant in the family Fabaceae and is endemic to southern Australia. It is an erect, spindly shrub with hairy foliage, oblong to egg-shaped leaves with a pointed tip, and yellow flowers with red or orange markings.

== Description ==
Pultenaea elachista is a rigid, erect, spindly shrub that typically grows to a height of 30–50 cm (12–20 in) high and has hairy branches. The leaves are arranged in opposite pairs, oblong to egg-shaped, 3–5 mm (0.12–0.20 in) long and 2–3 mm (0.079–0.118 in) wide and hairy when young. There is a point on the ends of the leaves, the edges are rolled under, there are lance-shaped stipules at the base and the lower surface is densely woolly-hairy. The flowers are arranged singly in small groups in leaf exils near the ends of short side branches and are about 8 mm (0.31 in) long and more or less sessile. The sepals are hairy, 8–9 mm (0.31–0.35 in) long with bracteoles at the base. The standard petal is yellow with red or orange markings, 9–9.5 mm (0.35–0.37 in) long and much longer than broad, the wings 8–8.5 mm (0.31–0.33 in) long and the keel 8.0–8.2 mm (0.31–0.32 in) long. Flowering occurs from July to December and the fruit is a hairy pod.

== Taxonomy and naming ==
This species was first formally described in 1875 by Ferdinand von Mueller who gave it the name Gastrolobium elachistum in Fragmenta phytographiae Australiae. In 1982, Michael Crisp changed the name to Pultenaea elachista in the Journal of the Adelaide Botanic Gardens. The specific epithet (elachista) means "smallest", referring to the leaves.

== Distribution ==
Pultenaea elachista grows on plains in the Coolgardie, Esperance Plains, Hampton and Mallee biogeographic regions of southern Western Australia and in the Nullarbor, Eyre Peninsula and Kangaroo Island regions of South Australia.

== Conservation status ==
Pultenaea elachista is classified as "not threatened" by the Government of Western Australia Department of Parks and Wildlife.
