= Daviesia subulata =

Scientific classification
- Kingdom: Plantae
- Clade: Tracheophytes
- Clade: Angiosperms
- Clade: Eudicots
- Clade: Rosids
- Order: Fabales
- Family: Fabaceae
- Subfamily: Faboideae
- Genus: Daviesia
- Species: D. subulata

Binomial name
- Daviesia subulata Crisp & G.Chandler

Species of legume

Daviesia subulata is a species of flowering plant in the family Fabaceae and is endemic to a restricted area in the south-west of Western Australia. It is a dense shrub with vertically flattened, sharply pointed phyllodes and yellow and red flowers.

== Description ==
Daviesia subulata is a dense, glabrous shrub that typically grows to a height of 1.0–1.6 m (3 ft 3 in – 5 ft 3 in). Its phyllodes are vertically flattened, 4–12 mm (0.16–0.47 in) long, 1.5–4 mm (0.059–0.157 in) broad and sharply pointed. The flowers are arranged in one or two groups of two to five in leaf axils on a peduncle 0.5–2 mm (0.020–0.079 in) long, the rachis 1.0–2.5 mm (0.039–0.098 in) long, each flower on a pedicel 1.0–1.5 mm (0.039–0.059 in) long. The sepals are 3.0–3.5 mm (0.12–0.14 in) long and joined at the base, the three lower lobes triangular. The standard petal is elliptic with a notched centre, about 5 mm (0.20 in) long, 6.0–6.5 mm (0.24–0.26 in) wide and yellow grading to red in the centre. The wings are 5.0–5.5 mm (0.20–0.22 in) long, the keel 4.5–5.0 mm (0.18–0.20 in) long and red. Flowering occurs in July and the fruit is a compressed, triangular pod about 5 mm (0.20 in) long.

== Taxonomy ==
Daviesia subulata was first formally described in 2017 by Michael Crisp and Gregory T. Chandler in the journal Phytotaxa from specimens collected near Morawa in 1996. The specific epithet (subulata) means "awl-shaped" or tapering to a very fine point, referring to the phyllodes.

== Distribution and habitat ==
This daviesia mostly grows in disturbed in open scrub in several sites near Morawa in the between Eneabba and Mingenew in the Avon Wheatbelt bioregion of south-western Western Australia.

== Conservation status ==
Daviesia subulata is classified as "not threatened" by the Western Australian Government Department of Biodiversity, Conservation and Attractions.
