= Calytrix harvestiana =

Conservation status
- Priority Two — Poorly Known Taxa (DEC)

Scientific classification
- Kingdom: Plantae
- Clade: Tracheophytes
- Clade: Angiosperms
- Clade: Eudicots
- Clade: Rosids
- Order: Myrtales
- Family: Myrtaceae
- Genus: Calytrix
- Species: C. harvestiana

Binomial name
- Calytrix harvestiana (F.Muell.) Craven

Synonyms
- Lhotskya harvestiana F.Muell.; Lhotzkya harvestiana F.Muell. orth. var.

Species of flowering plant

Calytrix harvestiana is a species of flowering plant in the myrtle family Myrtaceae and is endemic to the west of Western Australia. It is a glabrous shrub with linear, elliptic or egg-shaped leaves and purplish mauve to purple or violet flowers with about 60 to 70 pale yellow stamens in multiple rows.

== Description ==
Calytrix harvestiana is a glabrous shrub that typically grows to a height of up to 75 cm (30 in). Its leaves are spreading to erect, linear, elliptic or egg-shaped, 2.0–4.5 mm (0.079–0.177 in) long and 0.7–1.25 mm (0.028–0.049 in) wide on a petiole 0.25–0.75 mm (0.0098–0.0295 in) long. There are no stipules. The flowers are borne on a peduncle 3.4–4.0 mm (0.13–0.16 in) long with broadly elliptical to more or less round, lobes 2.0–2.5 mm (0.079–0.098 in) long. The floral tube has 10 ribs and is 3.5–4.5 mm (0.14–0.18 in) long and surrounds the style. The sepals are fused at the base, elliptic to broadly elliptic, 2.75–3.0 mm (0.108–0.118 in) long and 2.0–2.5 mm (0.079–0.098 in) wide. The petals are purplish mauve to purple or violet and become ochreous to reddish purple near the base, otherwise all yellow, and not changing colour. The petals are elliptic, narrowly elliptic or egg-shaped, 5.5–6.5 mm (0.22–0.26 in) long and 2–3 mm (0.079–0.118 in) wide and there are about 60 to 70 pale yellow stamens in multiple rows. Flowering from September to December and the seed is oval, about 2.5 mm (0.098 in) long and 0.7 mm (0.028 in) wide.

== Taxonomy ==
This species was first described in 1878 by Ferdinand von Mueller who gave it the name Lhotskya harvestiana in his Fragmenta Phytographiae Australiae from specimens he collected between the Murchison River and Shark Bay. In 1987, Lyndley Craven transferred the species to Calytrix as C. harvestiana in the journal Brunonia. The specific epithet (harvestiana) honours Edward Douglass Harvest (1824–1901), the attorney general and administrator of the Colony of Western Australia for short periods from 1875 to 1879.

== Distribution and habitat ==
Calytrix harvestiana grows in sandy heath and Casuarina campestris heath in the Kalbarri-Yuna district in the Geraldton Sandplains bioregion of Western Australia.

== Conservation status ==
This species of Calytrix is listed as "Priority Two" by the Government of Western Australia Department of Biodiversity, Conservation and Attractions, meaning that it is poorly known and from one or a few locations.
