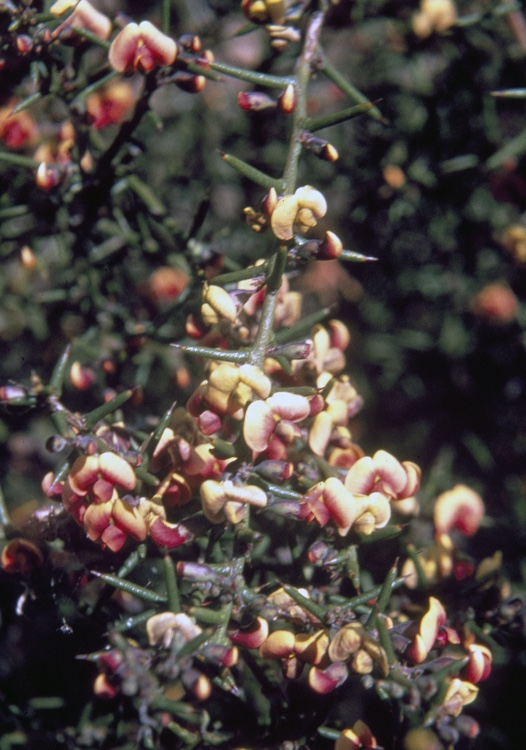
- Near Ravensthorpe

Scientific classification
- Kingdom: Plantae
- Clade: Tracheophytes
- Clade: Angiosperms
- Clade: Eudicots
- Clade: Rosids
- Order: Fabales
- Family: Fabaceae
- Subfamily: Faboideae
- Genus: Daviesia
- Species: D. articulata

Binomial name
- Daviesia articulata Crisp

= Daviesia articulata =

Species of flowering plant

Daviesia articulata is a species of flowering plant in the family Fabaceae and is endemic to the south-west of Western Australia. It is a rigid, low-lying or erect shrub with scattered, tapering, cylindrical and sharply pointed phyllodes, and yellow and red flowers.

== Description ==
Daviesia articulata is a rigid, low-lying or erect shrub that typically grows up to 1 m (3 ft 3 in) and 2 m (6 ft 7 in) wide. Its leaves are reduced to scattered, tapering cylindrical, sharply-pointed phyllodes, 3–40 mm (0.12–1.57 in) long and about 1 mm (0.039 in) wide. The flowers are arranged in groups of up to five in leaf axils on a peduncle about 1 mm (0.039 in) long, each flower on a pedicel 0.5–3 mm (0.020–0.118 in) long with oblong or spatula-shaped bracts at the base. The sepals are 2.5–4.0 mm (0.098–0.157 in) long, the two upper joined in a broad "lip" and the lower three smaller and triangular. The standard petal is curved backwards, yellow with a red base and bright yellow centre and about 7 mm (0.28 in) long, the wings red with yellow tips and about 6.5 mm (0.26 in) long and the keel dark red and about 5 mm (0.20 in) long. Flowering occurs from August to December and the fruit is a flattened triangular pod 8–11 mm (0.31–0.43 in) long.

== Taxonomy and naming ==
Daviesia articulata was first formally described in 1995 by Michael Crisp in Australian Systematic Botany from specimens collected east of Ravensthorpe in 1979. The specific epithet (articulata) means "jointed", referring to the base of the phyllode.

== Distribution and habitat ==
This species of pea mainly grows in woodland or mallee in the area between Kellerberrin, Kojonup, the Stirling Range and Salmon Gums in the Avon Wheatbelt, Coolgardie, Esperance Plains, Jarrah Forest and Mallee biogeographic regions in the south-west of Western Australia.

== Conservation status ==
Daviesia articulata is classified as "not threatened" by the Government of Western Australia Department of Biodiversity, Conservation and Attractions.
