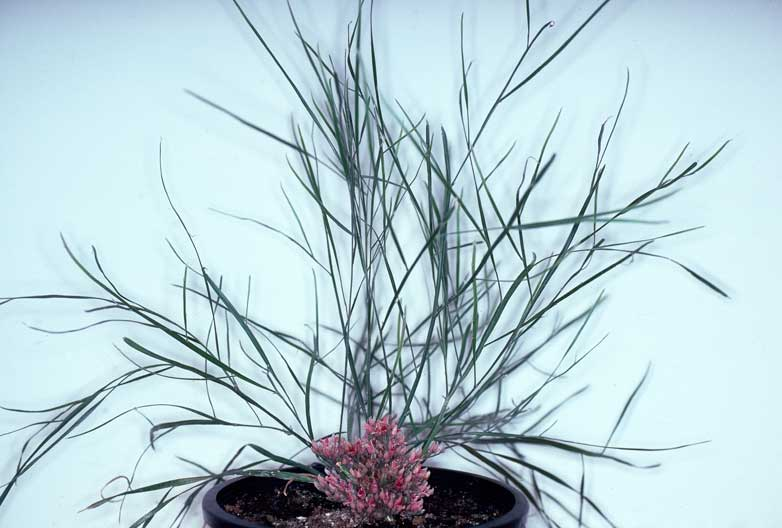
- In the ANBG nursery

Scientific classification
- Kingdom: Plantae
- Clade: Tracheophytes
- Clade: Angiosperms
- Clade: Eudicots
- Clade: Rosids
- Order: Fabales
- Family: Fabaceae
- Subfamily: Faboideae
- Genus: Leptosema
- Species: L. chapmanii

Binomial name
- Leptosema chapmanii Crisp

Synonyms
- Jacksonia sp. aff. J. anomala; Leptosema chapmanii M.B.Thomas & W.J.McDonald nom. inval., nom. nud.; Leptosema chapmanii K.A.W.Williams nom. inval., nom. nud.; Leptosema chapmanii M.B.Thomas & W.J.McDonald nom. inval., nom. nud.; Leptosema chapmanii Hacker nom. inval., nom. nud.; Leptosema sp. (Burra Range F.D.Hockings 30)

= Leptosema chapmanii =

Species of legume

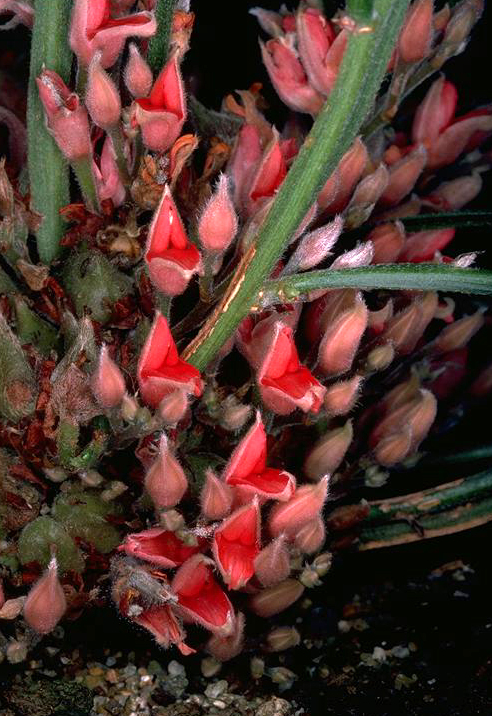
Flower detail

Leptosema chapmanii is a species of flowering plant in the family Fabaceae and is endemic to central Queensland. It is a shrub with stems and flattened branchlets, leaves reduced to triangular scales, deep pink flowers, and beaked, very broadly oval pods.

== Description ==
Leptosema chapmanii is a shrub with many stems that reach to up to 40 cm (16 in) high, and flattened branchlets 1.5–5 mm (0.059–0.197 in) wide. Its leaves are reduced to dark red, triangular scales 1.5–3 mm (0.059–0.118 in) long. The flowers are densely packed, resupinate, and borne in densely packed rosettes at the base of the plant, each flower on a pedicel 2–8 mm (0.079–0.315 in) long on a rhachis up to 30 mm (1.2 in) long with egg-shaped bracts about 1.5–2 mm (0.059–0.079 in) long and narrowly egg-shaped bracteoles. The sepals are pink and united for half their length, so that the flower gapes. The petals are deep pink, about the same length as the sepals, the standard petal 4–10 mm (0.16–0.39 in) long, the wings triangular, 4–10 mm (0.16–0.39 in) long and 1.0–1.5 mm (0.039–0.059 in) wide and the keel similar to the wings. There are five to eight stamens and the ovary is more or less sessile with 12 to 18 ovules. The pods are very broadly oval, 6–10 mm (0.24–0.39 in) long and 4.5–6 mm (0.18–0.24 in) wide including a beak 1–4 mm (0.039–0.157 in) long, containing a single kidney-shaped seed.

== Taxonomy ==
Leptosema chapmanii was first formally described in 1999 by Michael Crisp in Australian Systematic Botany from specimens raised from seeds collected from Queensland and cultivated in the Australian National Botanic Gardens. The specific epithet (chapmanii) honours Arthur Chapman, who discovered the species near Pentland.

== Distribution and habitat ==
This species of Leptosema grows in heath or shrubland on sandy or gravelly soil in the North Kennedy, Leichhardt and Mitchell districts of Central Queensland.

== Conservation status ==
Leptosema chapmanii is listed as of "least concern" under the Queensland Government Nature Conservation Act 1992.
