= Leptosema uniflorum =

Scientific classification
- Kingdom: Plantae
- Clade: Tracheophytes
- Clade: Angiosperms
- Clade: Eudicots
- Clade: Rosids
- Order: Fabales
- Family: Fabaceae
- Subfamily: Faboideae
- Genus: Leptosema
- Species: L. uniflorum

Binomial name
- Leptosema uniflorum (R.Br. ex Benth.) Crisp

Synonyms
- Brachysema uniflorum R.Br. ex Benth.; Leptosema sp.

Species of legume

Leptosema uniflorum is a species of flowering plant in the family Fabaceae and is endemic to the north of the Northern Territory. It is a prostrate or low-growing perennial shrub or subshrub with compressed or flat stems and branches, leaves reduced to narrowly egg-shaped scales, dark red flowers, and spindle-shaped, beaked pods.

== Description ==
Leptosema uniflorum is a prostrate or low-growing shrub or subshrub that typically grows up to 2 m (6 ft 7 in) wide, its stems and branches compressed or flat cladodes 2–5 mm (0.079–0.197 in) wide. Its adult leaves are reduced to narrowly egg-shaped scales about 3 mm (0.12 in) long, but that fall off as they mature. The flowers are resupinate, arranged singly along the cladodes, each flower on a pedicel 8–14 mm (0.31–0.55 in) long. The sepals are leathery, 6–8 mm (0.24–0.31 in) long and there are ten stamens. The petals are dark red and mostly shorter than the sepals, the standard petal about 8 mm (0.31 in) long and 7 mm (0.28 in) broad, the wings about 9 mm (0.35 in) long and 3 mm (0.12 in) wide and the keel pouch-like, 10 mm (0.39 in) long and 4 mm (0.16 in) wide. The ovary has about 17 ovules. Flowering occurs from April to July, and the pods are spindle-shaped and beaked, 20–27 mm (0.79–1.06 in) long and 7–10 mm (0.28–0.39 in) wide containing a kidney-shaped, yellowish-brown seed about 3.5 mm (0.14 in) long.

== Taxonomy ==
This species was first formally described in 1864 by George Bentham from an unpublished description of Robert Brown, who gave it the name Brachysema uniflorum in his Flora Australiensis from specimens collected between by Brown on "islands of the Gulf of Carpentaria. In 1999, Michael Crisp transferred the species to Leptosema as L. uniflorum in Australian Systematic Botany. The specific epithet (uniflorum) means 'one-flowered'.

== Distribution and habitat ==
Leptosema uniflorum grows in sand over sandstone or laterite in heath or woodland in Arnhem Land and offshore islands including Melville Island.

== Conservation status ==
Leptosema uniflorum is listed as of "least concern" under the Northern Territory Territory Parks and Wildlife Conservation Act.
