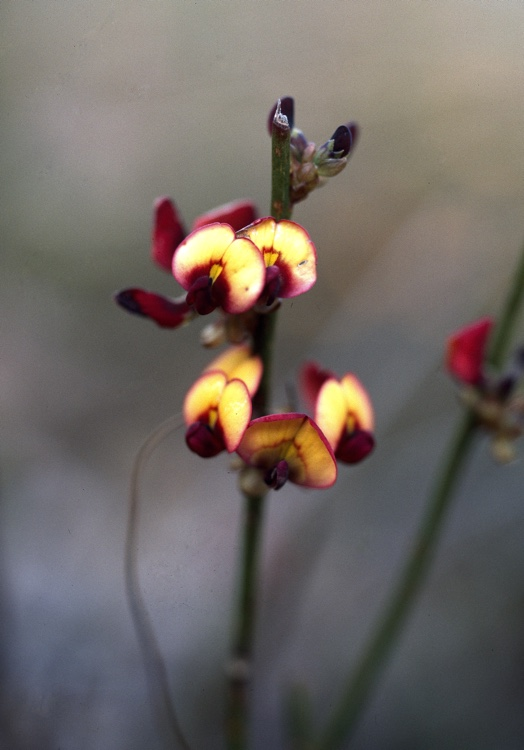
- Daviesia gracilis in the Stirling Range National Park

Scientific classification
- Kingdom: Plantae
- Clade: Tracheophytes
- Clade: Angiosperms
- Clade: Eudicots
- Clade: Rosids
- Order: Fabales
- Family: Fabaceae
- Subfamily: Faboideae
- Genus: Daviesia
- Species: D. gracilis

Binomial name
- Daviesia gracilis Crisp

= Daviesia gracilis =

Species of flowering plant

Daviesia gracilis is a species of flowering plant in the family Fabaceae and is endemic to the south-west of Western Australia. It is an open, spreading shrub with its phyllodes reduced to scales, and has orange-yellow and maroon flowers.

== Description ==
Daviesia gracilis is an open, spreading, glabrous shrub that typically grows to a height of up to 50 cm (20 in), its phyllodes reduced to scales. The flowers are arranged in groups of three to five on a peduncle 1.0–1.5 mm (0.039–0.059 in) long, the rachis 0.5–3 mm (0.020–0.118 in) long, each flower on a pedicel 3–6 mm (0.12–0.24 in) long with oblong, overlapping bracts about 4 mm (0.16 in) long at the base. The sepals are about 3.0–3.5 mm (0.12–0.14 in) long and joined at the base. The standard petal is elliptic, 8–9 mm (0.31–0.35 in) long and orange-yellow with a thin maroon border, the wings about 7.0–7.5 mm (0.28–0.30 in) long and maroon, and the keel is 3.5–4.5 mm (0.14–0.18 in) long and maroon. Flowering occurs from July to October and the fruit is a flattened triangular pod 16–19 mm (0.63–0.75 in) long.

== Taxonomy and naming ==
Daviesia gracilis was first formally described in 1984 by Michael Crisp in the journal Nuytsia from specimens collected by Archibald Menzies at King George Sound in 1791. The specific epithet (gracilis) means "thin or slender".

== Distribution and habitat ==
This daviesia grows in heath or open woodland between Kojonup, King George Sound and Bremer Bay in the Esperance Plains and Jarrah Forest regions of south-western Western Australia.

== Conservation status ==
Daviesia gracilis is listed as "not threatened" by the Department of Biodiversity, Conservation and Attractions.
