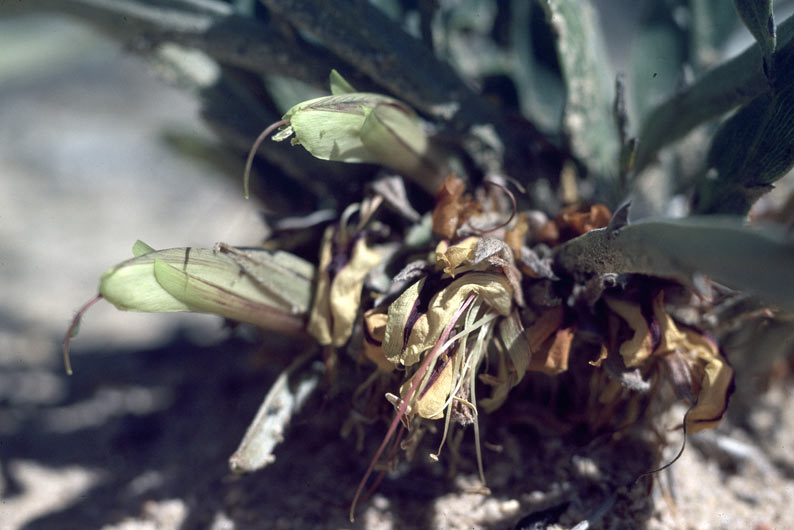

Scientific classification
- Kingdom: Plantae
- Clade: Tracheophytes
- Clade: Angiosperms
- Clade: Eudicots
- Clade: Rosids
- Order: Fabales
- Family: Fabaceae
- Subfamily: Faboideae
- Genus: Leptosema
- Species: L. tomentosum

Binomial name
- Leptosema tomentosum (Benth.) Crisp

Synonyms
- Brachysema tomentosum Benth.

= Leptosema tomentosum =

Species of legume

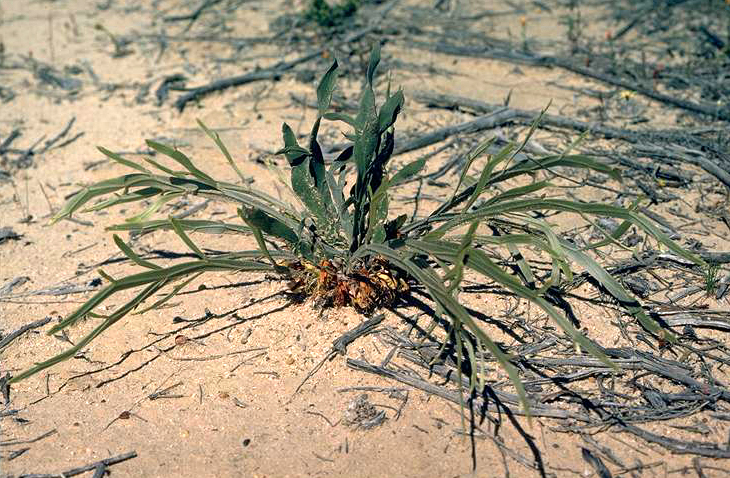
Habit near Cadoux

Leptosema tomentosum is a species of flowering plant in the family Fabaceae and is endemic to the south-west of Western Australia. It is a densely tufted, leafless shrub with arching stems, broadly winged branches and branchlets, leaves reduced to egg-shaped scales, yellowish-green flowers, and broadly egg-shaped, beaked pods.

== Description ==
Leptosema tomentosum is a densely tufted, leafless shrub or subshrub that typically grows up to 50 cm (20 in) high and 1 m (3 ft 3 in) wide and has arching stems, its branches and branchlets winged and 2–10 mm (0.079–0.394 in) wide. Its adult leaves are reduced to egg-shaped scales 2.5–5 mm (0.098–0.197 in) long. The flowers are resupinate, and borne in racemes of up to twelve in rosettes at the base of the plant, each flower 35–45 mm (1.4–1.8 in) long on a pedicel 5–15 mm (0.20–0.59 in) long on a rhachis up to 70 mm (2.8 in) long. The sepals are 25–31 mm (0.98–1.22 in) long. The petals are yellowish-green, the standard petal 14–15 mm (0.55–0.59 in) long and enclosed in the sepal tube, the wings linear, 25–33 mm (0.98–1.30 in) long and 2.5–4 mm (0.098–0.157 in) wide and the keel protruding, linear to egg-shaped, 34–36 mm (1.3–1.4 in) long and 5.0–5.5 mm (0.20–0.22 in) wide. The ovary has about 50 ovules. Flowering occurs from August to October, and the pods are hairy, very broadly egg-shaped, 12–15 mm (0.47–0.59 in) long and 8–10 mm (0.31–0.39 in) wide, including a beak 4–8 mm (0.16–0.31 in) long.

== Taxonomy ==
This species was first formally described in 1864 by George Bentham who gave it the name Brachysema tomentosum in his Flora Australiensis from specimens collected between the Moore and Murchison Rivers by James Drummond. In 1987, Michael Crisp transferred the species to Leptosema as L. tomentosum in Australian Systematic Botany. The specific epithet (tomentosum) means 'tomentose'.

== Distribution and habitat ==
Leptosema tomentosum grows on sand in heath between the Kalbarri National Park and Wongan Hills in the Avon Wheatbelt, Geraldton Sandplains and Yalgoo bioregions of south-western Western Australia.

== Conservation status ==
Leptosema tomentosum is listed as "not threatened" by the Government of Western Australia Department of Biodiversity, Conservation and Attractions.
