= Daviesia podophylla =

Scientific classification
- Kingdom: Plantae
- Clade: Tracheophytes
- Clade: Angiosperms
- Clade: Eudicots
- Clade: Rosids
- Order: Fabales
- Family: Fabaceae
- Subfamily: Faboideae
- Genus: Daviesia
- Species: D. podophylla

Binomial name
- Daviesia podophylla Crisp

Species of flowering plant

Daviesia podophylla, commonly known as buggery bush, is a species of flowering plant in the family Fabaceae and is endemic to the south-west of Western Australia. It is an openly-branched, glabrous, glaucous shrub with many often sharply-pointed branchlets, triangular phyllodes with a sharp point on the end, and orange-yellow, dark red and black flowers.

== Description ==
Daviesia podophylla is an openly-branched, glabrous, glaucous shrub that typically grows up to 1 m (3 ft 3 in) high and 2 m (6 ft 7 in) wide, and has many, often sharply-pointed branchlets. Its phyllodes are moderately crowded, vertically flattened, triangular, up to 25 mm (0.98 in) long and 8 mm (0.31 in) wide, often with a sharp point one its the corners. The flowers are usually arranged singly or pairs in leaf axils on a peduncle 1–2.5 mm (0.039–0.098 in) long, the rachis up to 0.5 mm (0.020 in) long, each flower on a pedicel 2–4 mm (0.079–0.157 in) long with spatula-shaped bracts about 0.5 mm (0.020 in) long at the base. The sepals are 2.5–3.0 mm (0.098–0.118 in) long and joined at the base the upper two lobes joined for most of their length and the lower three flared. The standard petal is broadly egg-shaped with a notched centre or heart-shaped, 7.5–8.0 mm (0.30–0.31 in) long, 6–7 mm (0.24–0.28 in) wide, and yellow-orange with a dark red centre. The wings are 6.0–8.5 mm (0.24–0.33 in) long and black with a dark red edge, the keel 7.0–7.5 mm (0.28–0.30 in) long, dark red and black. Flowering mainly occurs from June to August and the fruit is a flattened, triangular pod 11–16 mm (0.43–0.63 in) long.

== Taxonomy and naming ==
Daviesia podophylla was first formally described in 1984 by Michael Crisp in the journal Nuytsia from specimens collected west of Coorow in 1978. The specific epithet (podophylla) means "foot-leaved", referring to the petiole-like base of the phyllodes.

== Distribution and habitat ==
This daviesia grows in heath between Perth and Kalbarri, and is common from Jurien Bay to Three Springs, in the Avon Wheatbelt, Geraldton Sandplains, Jarrah Forest and Swan Coastal Plain biogeographic regions of south-western Western Australia.

== Conservation status ==
Daviesia podophylla is listed as "not threatened" by the Western Australian Government Department of Biodiversity, Conservation and Attractions.
