= Pultenaea craigiana =

Scientific classification
- Kingdom: Plantae
- Clade: Tracheophytes
- Clade: Angiosperms
- Clade: Eudicots
- Clade: Rosids
- Order: Fabales
- Family: Fabaceae
- Subfamily: Faboideae
- Genus: Pultenaea
- Species: P. craigiana

Binomial name
- Pultenaea craigiana C.F.Wilkins, Orthia & Crisp

Species of flowering plant

Pultenaea craigiana is a species of flowering plant in the family Fabaceae and is endemic to near Ravensthorpe in the south of Western Australia. It is an erect, spindly shrub with densely hairy young stems, egg-shaped leaves with the narrower end towards the base, and yellow and red flowers.

== Description ==
Pultenaea craigiana is an erect, spindly shrub that typically grows up to 15–50 cm (5.9–19.7 in) high and 30–50 cm (12–20 in) wide with branchlets that are densely hairy when young. The leaves are egg-shaped with the narrower end towards the base, 1.3–8 mm (0.051–0.315 in) long and 0.5–0.9 mm (0.020–0.035 in) wide. The flowers are arranged singly in leaf axils on a pedicel 0.2–0.5 mm (0.0079–0.0197 in) long, sometimes in groups near the ends of branchlets. The sepals are joined at the base, forming a green tube with red lobes. The upper two sepals are fused for 2–3.9 mm (0.079–0.154 in) with lobes 0.5–0.6 mm (0.020–0.024 in) long and the lower three sepals are fused for 1.0–1.8 mm (0.039–0.071 in) with lobes 1.5–2.4 mm (0.059–0.094 in) long. There are reddish-brown bracteoles 0.9–1.3 mm (0.035–0.051 in) long at the base of the sepals. The standard petal is yellow with red veins,2–3.3 mm (0.079–0.130 in) long, the wings are 1.5–2 mm (0.059–0.079 in) long and the keel dark red and about 1.5 mm (0.059 in) long. Flowering occurs from August to November and the fruit is a pod 3.6–4.3 mm (0.14–0.17 in) long.

== Taxonomy and naming ==
Pultenaea craigiana was first formally described in 2009 by Carolyn F. Wilkins, L.A. Orthia and Michael Crisp in the journal Nuytsia from specimens collected by Gillian F. Craig near the southern limit of the Ravensthorpe Range. The specific epithet (craigiana) honours the collector of the type specimens.

== Distribution ==
This pultenaea grows in woodland and in burned shrubland and is only known from near the old Kundip townsite south of Ravensthorpe.

== Conservation status ==
Pultenaea craigiana is classified as "Priority Three" by the Government of Western Australia Department of Parks and Wildlife, meaning that it is poorly known and known from only a few locations but is not under imminent threat.
