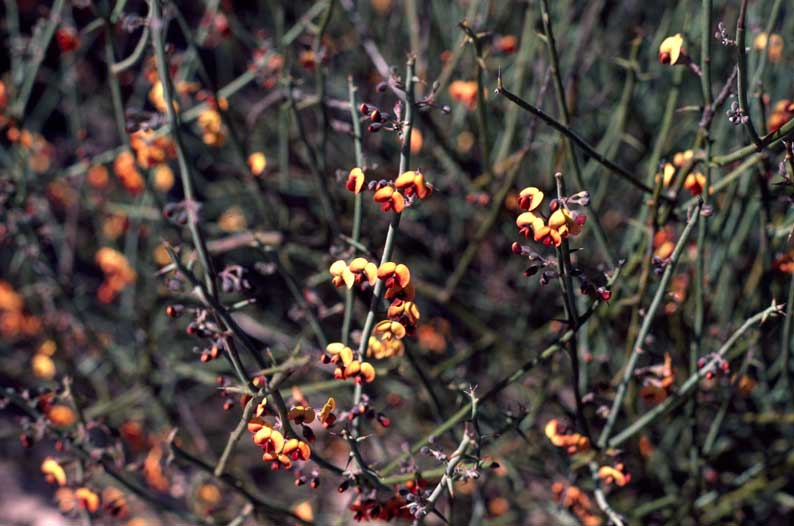
- In Cape Arid National Park

Scientific classification
- Kingdom: Plantae
- Clade: Tracheophytes
- Clade: Angiosperms
- Clade: Eudicots
- Clade: Rosids
- Order: Fabales
- Family: Fabaceae
- Subfamily: Faboideae
- Genus: Daviesia
- Species: D. retrorsa

Binomial name
- Daviesia retrorsa Crisp

= Daviesia retrorsa =

Species of legume

Daviesia retrorsa is a species of flowering plant in the family Fabaceae and is endemic to the south of Western Australia. It is a dense, tangled shrub with glabrous branchlets and leaves, scattered, needle-like, sharply pointed phyllodes turned backwards, and orange-yellow and red flowers.

== Description ==
Daviesia retrorsa is a glabrous shrub that typically grows up to 1.6 m (5 ft 3 in) high and 3 m (9.8 ft) wide, and has many tangled branchlets. Its phyllodes are scattered, needle-like, 5–50 mm (0.20–1.97 in) long, 1.0–1.5 mm (0.039–0.059 in) wide, sharply pointed and turned backwards. The flowers are arranged in leaf axils in a group of two to five flowers on a peduncle 1–7 mm (0.039–0.276 in) long, the rachis 0.5–6 mm (0.020–0.236 in) long, each flower on a pedicel 3–6 mm (0.12–0.24 in) long with oblong bracts about 1 mm (0.039 in) long. The sepals are 3.5–4.0 mm (0.14–0.16 in) long and joined at the base, the upper two lobes joined for most of their length, the lower three triangular. The standard petal is egg-shaped with a notched tip, 6.0–6.5 mm (0.24–0.26 in) long, 7.5–9 mm (0.30–0.35 in) wide, and orange-yellow with a red base and yellow centre. The wings are 5.0–5.5 mm (0.20–0.22 in) long and light red, the keel 4.5–5.0 mm (0.18–0.20 in) long. Flowering occurs from August to November and the fruit is a slightly inflated, triangular, purplish-grey pod 9–11 mm (0.35–0.43 in) long.

== Taxonomy ==
Daviesia retrorsa was first formally described in 1995 by Michael Crisp in Australian Systematic Botany from specimens collected by Mark Clements, near the Balladonia-Esperance track in 1980. The specific epithet (retrorsa) means "pointing backwards, referring to the phyllodes".

== Distribution and habitat ==
This daviesia grows in heath on dunes or rocky outcrops in near-coastal areas of southern Western Australia, east of Hopetoun in the Esperance Plains, Hampton and Mallee biogeographic regions of southern Western Australia.

== Conservation status ==
Daviesia retrorsa is listed as "not threatened" by the Government of Western Australia Department of Biodiversity, Conservation and Attractions.
