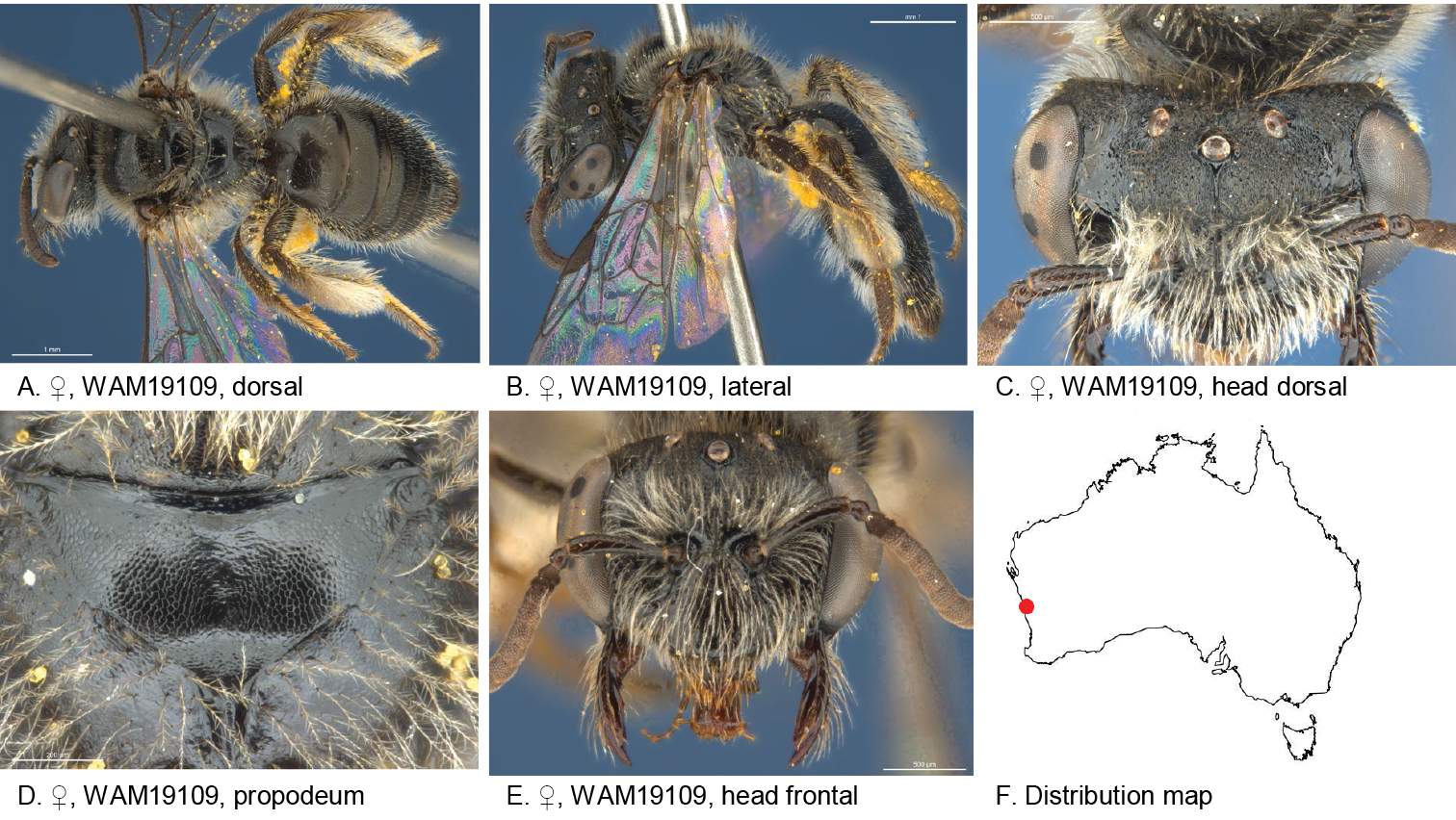
- Female holotype

Scientific classification
- Kingdom: Animalia
- Phylum: Arthropoda
- Clade: Pancrustacea
- Class: Insecta
- Order: Hymenoptera
- Family: Colletidae
- Genus: Leioproctus
- Species: L. albiscopis

Binomial name
- Leioproctus albiscopis Leijs 2018

= Leioproctus albiscopis =

Species of bee

Leioproctus albiscopis, or Leioproctus (Colletellus) albiscopis, is a species of bee in the family Colletidae and subfamily Colletinae. It is endemic to Australia. It was described by entomologist Remko Leijs in 2018.

== Etymology ==
The specific epithet albiscopis is an anatomical reference to white hair on the hind scopa on the tibia of the female.

== Description ==
The female holotype body length is 6.2 mm, head width 2 mm. Integumental colouration is mainly black, with brown markings. The hair is white to grey-brown.

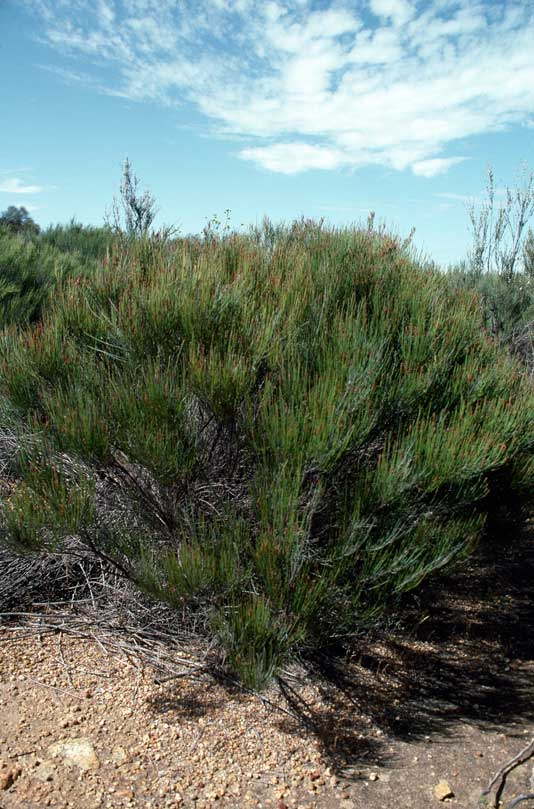
Allocasuarina campestris, a forage plant of the bees

== Distribution and habitat ==
The species occurs in the Mid West region of Western Australia. The type locality is Arrowsmith River.

== Behaviour ==
The adults are flying mellivores. Flowering plants visited by the bees include Allocasuarina campestris.
