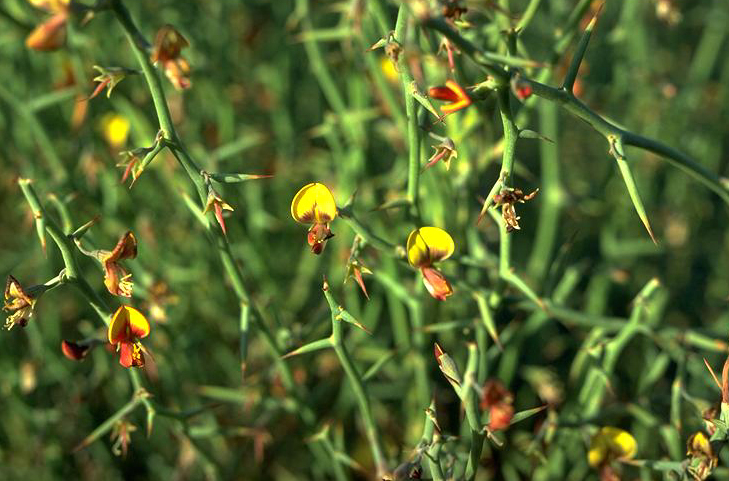

Scientific classification
- Kingdom: Plantae
- Clade: Tracheophytes
- Clade: Angiosperms
- Clade: Eudicots
- Clade: Rosids
- Order: Fabales
- Family: Fabaceae
- Subfamily: Faboideae
- Genus: Daviesia
- Species: D. rhizomata

Binomial name
- Daviesia rhizomata Crisp

= Daviesia rhizomata =

Species of legume

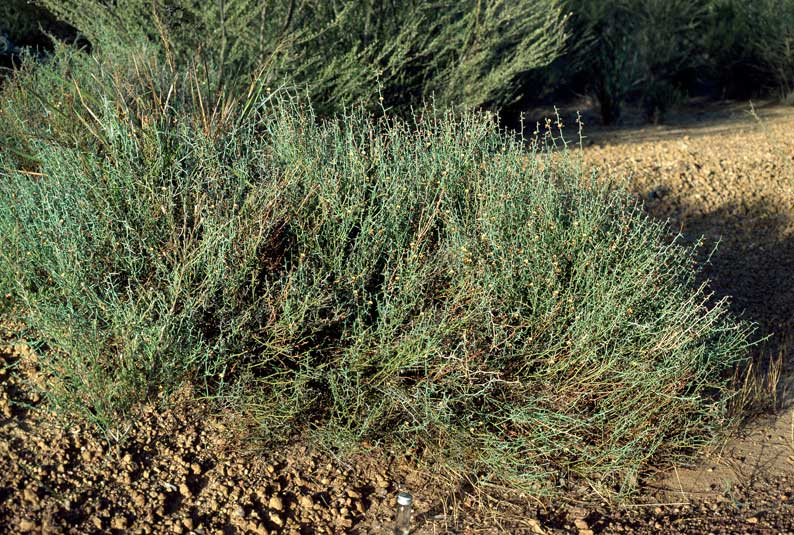
Habit near Lake Grace

Daviesia rhizomata is a species of flowering plant in the family Fabaceae and is endemic to the south-west of Western Australia. It is a low, rhizome-forming shrub with tangled branchlets, scattered, needle-like, sharply pointed phyllodes, and yellow and red flowers.

== Description ==
Daviesia rhizomata is a shrub that typically grows to a height of 0.3–1 m (1 ft 0 in – 3 ft 3 in) and forms rhizomes from which new plants arise. Its phyllodes are scattered, needle-like, 4–45 mm (0.16–1.77 in) long, 1–2 mm (0.039–0.079 in) wide and sharply pointed. The flowers are arranged singly in leaf axils on a peduncle 1–2 mm (0.039–0.079 in) long and a pedicel 1–3 mm (0.039–0.118 in) long with very small bracts at the base. The sepals are 4–5 mm (0.16–0.20 in) long and joined at the base, the lobes about 1.75 mm (0.069 in) long. The standard petal is broadly egg-shaped with a notched tip, about 7 mm (0.28 in) long, 7–9 mm (0.28–0.35 in) wide, and yellow with a red base and yellow centre. The wings are about 7 mm (0.28 in) long and red with yellow tips, the keel about 8 mm (0.31 in) long, red and yellow. Flowering occurs in January and February and the fruit is an inflated, triangular pod 11–13 mm (0.43–0.51 in) long.

== Taxonomy ==
Daviesia rhizomata was first formally described in 1995 by Michael Crisp in Australian Systematic Botany from specimens he collected near Hyden in 1979. The specific epithet (rhizomata) means "rhizome-possessing".

== Distribution and habitat ==
This daviesia grows in tall heath and mallee between Hyden, Lake Grace and Newdegate in the Coolgardie and Mallee biogeographic regions of south-western Western Australia.

== Conservation status ==
Daviesia rhizomata is listed as "not threatened" by the Government of Western Australia Department of Biodiversity, Conservation and Attractions.
