= Leptosema aculeatum =

Scientific classification
- Kingdom: Plantae
- Clade: Tracheophytes
- Clade: Angiosperms
- Clade: Eudicots
- Clade: Rosids
- Order: Fabales
- Family: Fabaceae
- Subfamily: Faboideae
- Genus: Leptosema
- Species: L. aculeatum

Binomial name
- Leptosema aculeatum Crisp

Species of legume

Leptosema aculeatum is a species of flowering plant in the family Fabaceae and is endemic to inland areas of Western Australia. It is a shrub with a tuft of stems up to 30 cm (12 in) tall, many rigid, strongly flattened and spiny branchlets, leaves reduced to scales, red flowers, and beaked pods densely covered with silky hairs.

== Description ==
Leptosema aculeatum is a shrub with a tuft of stems up to 30 cm (12 in) tall, its branchlets strongly compressed or flattened and spiny. Its leaves are reduced to awl-shaped scales, 0.5–2 mm (0.020–0.079 in) long. The flowers are red, resupinate, and borne in rose-shaped, loosely arranged clusters spreading along the soil surface on a rhachis up to 150 mm (5.9 in) long with egg-shaped bracts about 3 mm (0.12 in) long. The sepals are 25–30 mm (0.98–1.18 in) long and form a tube about 4 mm (0.16 in) long. The standard petal is enclosed in the sepals, the wings are linear, 32–36 mm (1.3–1.4 in) long and 2–3 mm (0.079–0.118 in) wide with the keel protruding and 35–40 mm (1.4–1.6 in) long. The ovary is more or less sessile, densely covered with silky hairs with about 60 ovules. The pods are sessile, elliptic, beaked, 7–15 mm (0.28–0.59 in) long and 4–9 mm (0.16–0.35 in) wide and densely covered with silky hairs.

== Taxonomy ==
Leptosema aculeatum was first formally described in 1987 by Michael Crisp in the Journal of the Adelaide Botanic Gardens from specimens collected 35 km (22 mi) west of Plumridge Lakes in 1979. The specific epithet (aculeatum) means 'prickly', referring to the spiny branchlets.

== Distribution and habitat ==
This species of Leptosema grows in hummock grassland dominated by Triodia from near Sandstone and south to near Mount Jackson and east to Queen Victoria Spring in the Coolgardie, Great Victoria Desert and Murchison bioregions of inland Western Australia.

== Conservation status ==
Jacksonia condensata is listed as "not threatened" by the Government of Western Australia Department of Biodiversity, Conservation and Attractions.
