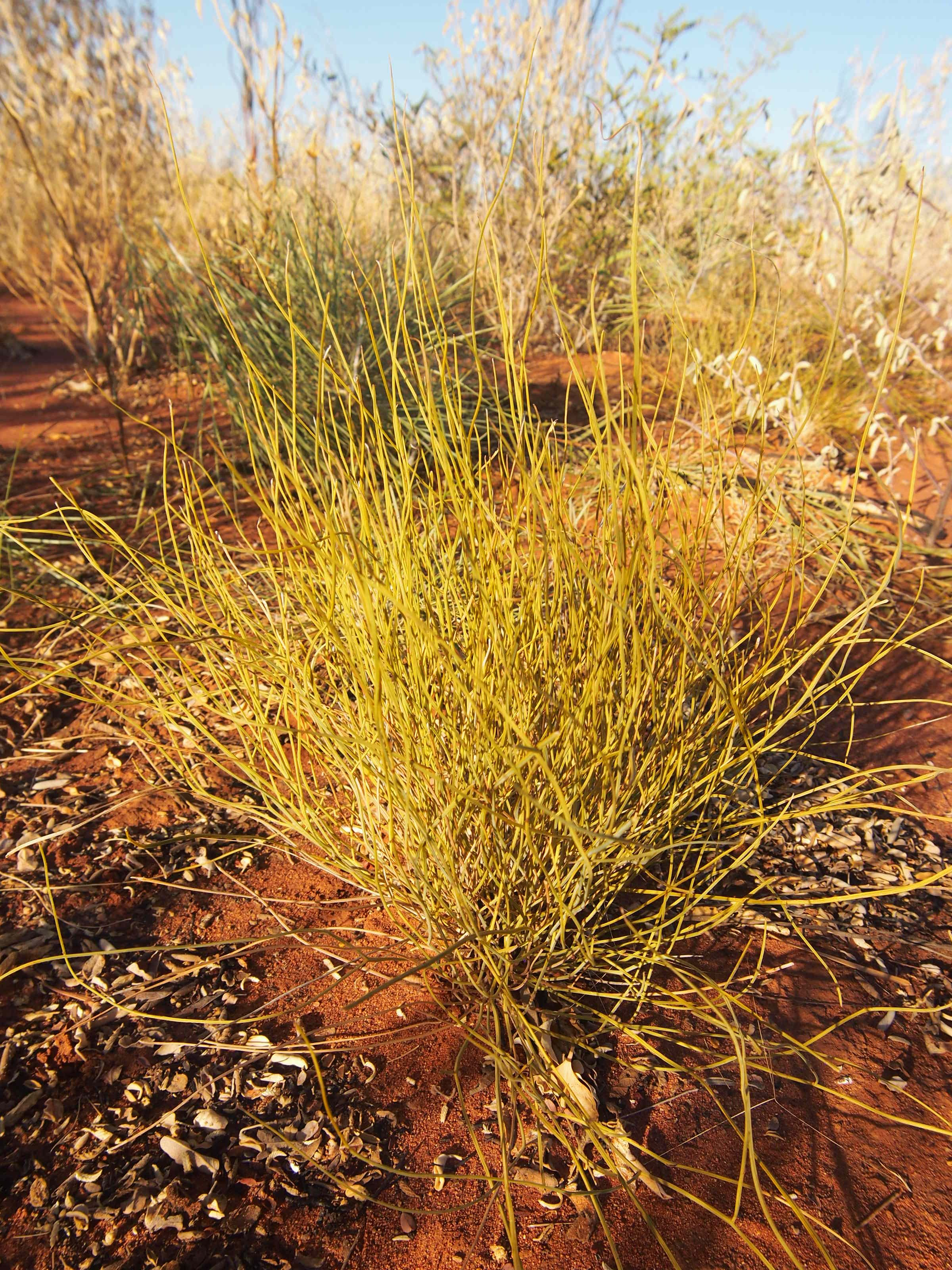

Scientific classification
- Kingdom: Plantae
- Clade: Tracheophytes
- Clade: Angiosperms
- Clade: Eudicots
- Clade: Rosids
- Order: Fabales
- Family: Fabaceae
- Subfamily: Faboideae
- Genus: Leptosema
- Species: L. anomalum

Binomial name
- Leptosema anomalum (Ewart & Morrison) Crisp

Synonyms
- Jacksonia anomala Ewart & Morrison; Jacksonia petrophiliodes W.Fitzg. orth. var.; Jacksonia petrophiloides W.Fitzg.

= Leptosema anomalum =

Species of legume

Leptosema anomalum is a species of flowering plant in the family Fabaceae and is endemic to northern Australia. It is a shrub or subshrub with a broom-like stems with many branches, leaves reduced to narrowly egg-shaped scales, pale greenish flowers, and beaked, oval pods.

== Description ==
Leptosema anomalum is a shrub or subshrub with broom-like stems with many branches up to 50 cm (20 in) high, the branches and branchlets angular and ribbed, 1.0–1.5 mm (0.039–0.059 in) wide. Most of the leaves are reduced to reddish, narrowly egg-shaped scales, 1.5–4 mm (0.059–0.157 in) long. The flowers are crowded near the base of the stems, with pink, egg-shaped bracts 5–7 mm (0.20–0.28 in) long. The flowers are pale greenish, each flower on a pedicel up to 2 mm (0.079 in) long. The petals are shorter than the sepals, the standard petal shorter than the wings and keel, the standard 5–6 mm (0.20–0.24 in) long and 3–4 mm (0.12–0.16 in) broad, the wings narrowly egg-shaped, 6.5–8 mm (0.26–0.31 in) long and the keel elliptic, 7–8 mm (0.28–0.31 in) long. The ovary is more or less sessile, covered with silky hairs and sometimes has only two ovules. Flowering occurs from May to November, and the pods are oval, 6–9 mm (0.24–0.35 in) long and 3–4 mm (0.12–0.16 in) long, including the beak 2–3 mm (0.079–0.118 in) long.

== Taxonomy ==
This species was first formally described in 1913 by Alfred James Ewart and Alexander Morrison who gave it the name Jacksonia anomala in the Proceedings of the Royal Society of Victoria from specimens collected by Gerald Freer Hill in 1911. In 1980, Michael Crisp transferred the species to Leptosema as L. anomalum in the Journal of the Adelaide Botanic Gardens, noting that sometimes the number of ovules varies from two, and the flowers of several species of Leptosema have similar sized flowers to L. anomalum. The specific epithet (anomalum) means 'anomalous' or 'abnormal', because it was considered unusual in Jacksonia, in which it was first placed.

== Distribution and habitat ==
This species of Leptosema grows in deep red sand on sandplains, at the bases of sand dunes and in watercourses in the Dampierland, Great Sandy Desert, Pilbara and Tanami bioregions of northern Western Australia and the Dampierland, Davenport Murchison Ranges, Mitchell Grass Downs bioregion, Ord Victoria Plain, Pilbara, Sturt Plateau and Tanami bioregions of the Northern Territory.

== Conservation status ==
Leptosema anomalum is listed as "not threatened" by the Government of Western Australia Department of Biodiversity, Conservation and Attractions, and as of "least concern" under the Northern Territory Territory Parks and Wildlife Conservation Act.
