= Leptosema macrocarpum =

Scientific classification
- Kingdom: Plantae
- Clade: Tracheophytes
- Clade: Angiosperms
- Clade: Eudicots
- Clade: Rosids
- Order: Fabales
- Family: Fabaceae
- Subfamily: Faboideae
- Genus: Leptosema
- Species: L. macrocarpum

Binomial name
- Leptosema macrocarpum (Benth.) Crisp

Synonyms
- Brachysema macrocarpum Benth.

Species of legume

Leptosema macrocarpum is a species of flowering plant in the family Fabaceae and is endemic to near-coastal areas of Western Australia. It is a densely tufted subshrub with several stems, wavy, winged branchlets, leaves reduced to narrowly egg-shaped scales, dull pink to red flowers, and linear, cylindrical pods.

== Description ==
Leptosema macrocarpum is a densely tufted subshrub that typically grows to a height of up to 50 cm (20 in) and has several stems, and slightly wavy, winged branchlets 2–9 mm (0.079–0.354 in) wide. Its adult leaves are reduced to narrowly egg-shaped scales 2–6 mm (0.079–0.236 in) long, but that finally fall off. The flowers are arranged singly in the axils of scale leaves, resupinate, 22–32 mm (0.87–1.26 in) long on a pedicel 7–26 mm (0.28–1.02 in) long. The sepals are linear, up to 30 mm (1.2 in) long. The petals are dull pink to red, the standard petal narrowly oblong, up to 23 mm (0.91 in) long and 8 mm (0.31 in) wide, the wings narrowly egg-shaped, up to 24 mm (0.94 in) long and 4 mm (0.16 in) wide and the keel narrowly egg-shaped, 31 mm (1.2 in) long. The ovary is stalked with 50 or more ovules. The pods are linear, cylindrical, 60–80 mm (2.4–3.1 in) long including the remains of the style 10–12 mm (0.39–0.47 in) long.

== Taxonomy ==
This species was first formally described in 1864 by George Bentham who gave it the name Brachysema macrocarpum in his Flora Australiensis from specimens collected on Dirk Hartog Island. In 1987, Michael Crisp transferred the species to Leptosema as L. macrocarpum in Australian Systematic Botany. The specific epithet (macrocarpum) means 'large-fruited'.

== Distribution and habitat ==
Leptosema macrocarpum grows on near-coastal, calcareous soils or on hard limestone of red sandy soil over limestone, in hummock grassland with Triodia or shrubland, between the North West Cape and Horrocks in the Carnarvon, Geraldton Sandplains and Yalgoo bioregions of south-western Western Australia.

== Conservation status ==
Leptosema macrocarpum is listed as "not threatened" by the Government of Western Australia Department of Biodiversity, Conservation and Attractions.
