= Leptosema villosum =

Scientific classification
- Kingdom: Plantae
- Clade: Tracheophytes
- Clade: Angiosperms
- Clade: Eudicots
- Clade: Rosids
- Order: Fabales
- Family: Fabaceae
- Subfamily: Faboideae
- Genus: Leptosema
- Species: L. villosum

Binomial name
- Leptosema villosum Crisp

Species of legume

Leptosema villosum is a species of flowering plant in the family Fabaceae and is endemic to the north of the Northern Territory. It is a prostrate or erect shrub or subshrub with winged stems and branches, leaves reduced to narrowly egg-shaped, channelled scales, greenish flowers, and flattened, oblong pods with a small beak.

== Description ==
Leptosema villosum is a prostrate or erect shrub or subshrub that typically grows up to 50 cm (20 in) high, its stems and branches winged, up to 20 mm (0.79 in) wide. Its adult leaves are reduced to narrowly egg-shaped scales 4–6 mm (0.16–0.24 in) long. The flowers are not resupinate, mostly arranged along the stems and densely hairy, each flower on a pedicel 2–4 mm (0.079–0.157 in) long. The petals are greenish and shorter than the sepals, the standard petal 6–7 mm (0.24–0.28 in) long and 3.0–3.5 mm (0.12–0.14 in) broad, the wings more or less linear, 9.0–9.5 mm (0.35–0.37 in) long and 1.0–1.5 mm (0.039–0.059 in) wide and the keel pouch-like, 9.0–9.5 mm (0.35–0.37 in) long and 3.5–4.0 mm (0.14–0.16 in) wide. The ovary has a short stalk and two ovules. Flowering occurs in most months, and the pods are flattened, oblong, 7–8 mm (0.28–0.31 in) long and 4–5 mm (0.16–0.20 in) wide including a slender beak 2.5 mm (0.098 in) long.

== Taxonomy ==
Leptosema villosum was first formally described in 1999 by Michael Crisp in Australian Systematic Botany. The specific epithet (villosum) means 'villous'.

== Distribution and habitat ==
Leptosema villosum grows in sand over sandstone or laterite in sedgeland, woodland or forest in the Arnhem Coast, Arnhem Plateau Central Arnhem Gulf Coastal Gulf Fall and Uplands and Pine Creek bioregions of the Northern Territory. It occurs in the Kakadu, Limmen and Nitmiluk National Parks.

== Conservation status ==
Leptosema villosum is listed as of "least concern" under the Northern Territory Territory Parks and Wildlife Conservation Act.
