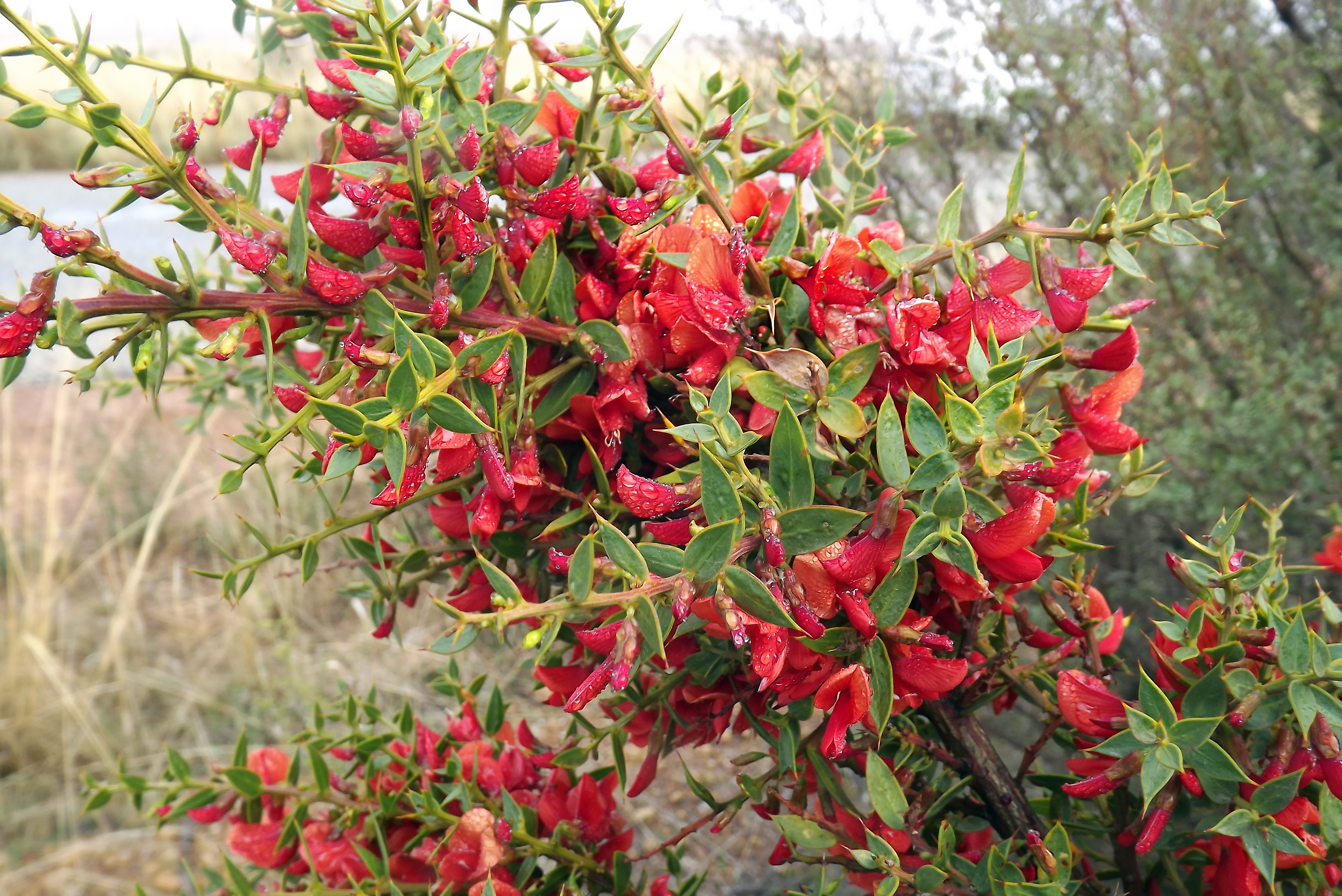
- Daviesia cunderdin near Cunderdin

Conservation status
- Declared rare (DEC)

Scientific classification
- Kingdom: Plantae
- Clade: Tracheophytes
- Clade: Angiosperms
- Clade: Eudicots
- Clade: Rosids
- Order: Fabales
- Family: Fabaceae
- Subfamily: Faboideae
- Genus: Daviesia
- Species: D. cunderdin

Binomial name
- Daviesia cunderdin Crisp & G.Chandler

= Daviesia cunderdin =

Cunderdin daviesia

Species of flowering plant

Daviesia cunderdin, commonly known as Cunderdin daviesia, is a species of flowering plant in the family Fabaceae and is endemic to a restricted area in the south-west of Western Australia. It is a compact, densely-branched shrub with scattered, elliptic to egg-shaped phyllodes, and uniformly red flowers.

== Description ==
Daviesia cunderdin is a compact, densely-branched shrub that typically grows to a height of 1.6 m (5 ft 3 in) and has softly hairy branchlets. Its leaves are reduced to scattered, elliptic to egg-shaped phyllodes mostly 10–20 mm (0.39–0.79 in) long and 4–9 mm (0.16–0.35 in) wide. The flowers are mostly arranged singly in leaf axils on a pedicel 3–5 mm (0.12–0.20 in) long with oblong bracts 1.0–1.5 mm (0.039–0.059 in) long at the base. The sepals are 5–7 mm (0.20–0.28 in) long and joined at the base, the two upper lobes joined for most of their length and the lower three triangular and about 2 mm (0.079 in) long. The flowers are uniformly red, the standard broadly egg-shaped to elliptic, 12–15 mm (0.47–0.59 in) long and about 12 mm (0.47 in) wide, the wings elliptic and 13–15 mm (0.51–0.59 in) long and the keel 16–17 mm (0.63–0.67 in) long. Flowering occurs in May and June and the fruit is a triangular pod about 14 mm (0.55 in) long.

== Taxonomy and naming ==
Daviesia cunderdin was first formally described in 1997 by Michael Crisp and Gregory T. Chandler in Australian Systematic Botany from specimens collected near Cunderdin in 1996. The specific epithet (cunderdin) refers to the type location.

== Distribution and habitat ==
Cunderdin daviesia grows in disturbed sites with kwongan vegetation and is only known from the type location in the Avon Wheatbelt biogeographic region of south-western Western Australia.

== Conservation status ==
This daviesia has been classified as "Threatened Flora (Declared Rare Flora — Extant)" by the Department of Biodiversity, Conservation and Attractions and an Interim Recovery Plan has been prepared.
