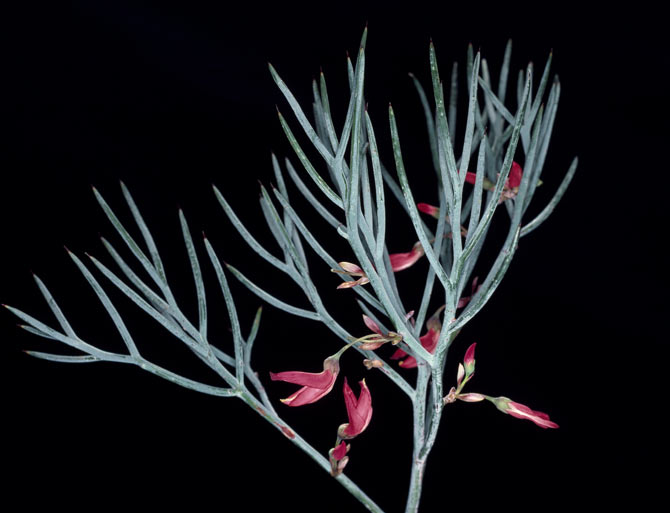
- In the Australian National Botanic Gardens

Conservation status
- Declared rare (DEC)

Scientific classification
- Kingdom: Plantae
- Clade: Tracheophytes
- Clade: Angiosperms
- Clade: Eudicots
- Clade: Rosids
- Order: Fabales
- Family: Fabaceae
- Subfamily: Faboideae
- Genus: Daviesia
- Species: D. speciosa

Binomial name
- Daviesia speciosa Crisp

= Daviesia speciosa =

Species of legume

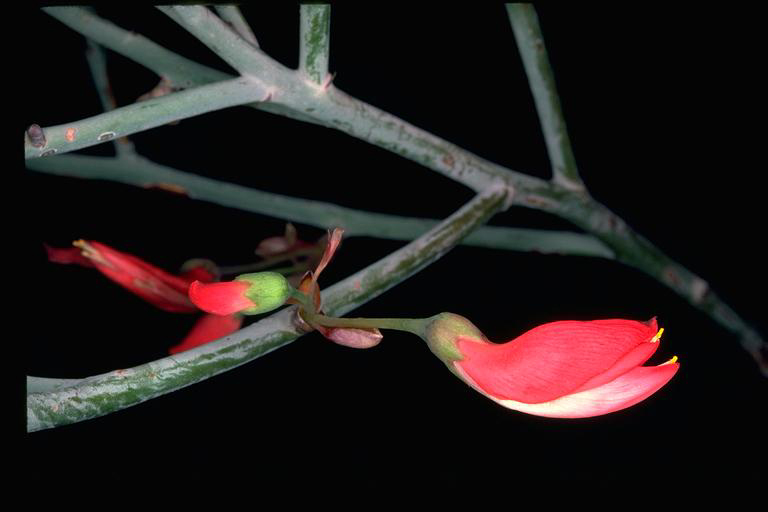
Flower detail

Daviesia speciosa is a species of flowering plant in the family Fabaceae and is endemic to the south-west of Western Australia. It is a low, erect, spindly, glabrous shrub with needle-shaped phyllodes almost indistinguishable from the branchlets, and red flowers.

== Description ==
Daviesia speciosa is an erect, spindly, glabrous shrub that typically grows to a height of up to 30–80 cm (12–31 in) and has many erect stems. Its phyllodes are tapering needle-shaped, almost indistinguishable from the branchlets and sharply pointed, 15–80 mm (0.59–3.15 in) long and about 2 mm (0.079 in) wide. The flowers are arranged singly or in pairs in leaf axils on a peduncle 3–4 mm (0.12–0.16 in) long, the rachis 2–6 mm (0.079–0.236 in) long, each flower on a thread-like pedicel 5–15 mm (0.20–0.59 in) long with linear bracts 8–10 mm (0.31–0.39 in) long at the base. The sepals are about 8–11 mm (0.31–0.43 in) long and joined at the base, the five lobes about 2 mm (0.079 in) long. The flowers are red, and apparently bird-pollinated, the standard petal egg-shaped, turned back through a small angle, about 20–23 mm (0.79–0.91 in) long and 15–17 mm (0.59–0.67 in) wide. The wings are 20–22 mm (0.79–0.87 in) long, and the keel 23–25 mm (0.91–0.98 in) long. Flowering occurs in April and May.

== Taxonomy ==
Daviesia speciosa was first formally described in 1995 by Michael Crisp in Australian Systematic Botany from specimens collected in 1958 by Charles Chapman near Eneabba. The specific epithet (speciosa) means "showy".

== Distribution and habitat ==
This daviesia grows in heath between Eneabba and Mingenew in the Avon Wheatbelt and Geraldton Sandplains biogeographic regions of south-western Western Australia.

== Conservation status ==
Daviesia speciosa is classified as "Threatened" by the Western Australian Government Department of Biodiversity, Conservation and Attractions, meaning that it is in danger of extinction.
