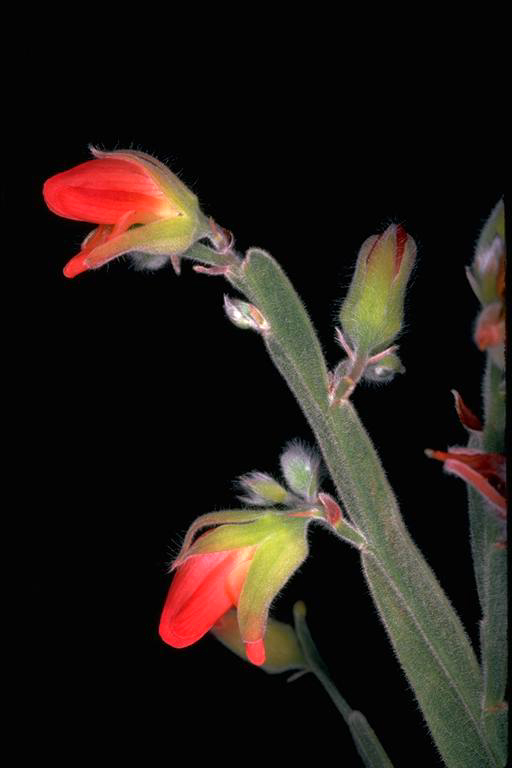
- In the Australian National Botanic Gardens

Scientific classification
- Kingdom: Plantae
- Clade: Tracheophytes
- Clade: Angiosperms
- Clade: Eudicots
- Clade: Rosids
- Order: Fabales
- Family: Fabaceae
- Subfamily: Faboideae
- Genus: Leptosema
- Species: L. oxylobioides

Binomial name
- Leptosema oxylobioides F.Muell.

Synonyms
- Brachysema oxylobioides (F.Muell.) Benth.; Brachysema oxyloboides K.A.W.Williams orth. var.

= Leptosema oxylobioides =

Species of legume

Leptosema oxylobioides is a species of flowering plant in the family Fabaceae and is endemic to Queensland. It is a shrub with winged, bendy stems and branches, leaves reduced to narrowly egg-shaped scales, orange-red to scarlet flowers, and elliptic, inflated and beaked pods.

== Description ==
Leptosema oxylobioides is a shrub that has a single to several stems that typically grow to a height of up to 1 m (3 ft 3 in), with more or less wavy, winged stems and branches 4–18 mm (0.16–0.71 in) wide. Its adult leaves are reduced to narrowly egg-shaped scales 3–5 mm (0.12–0.20 in) long, but that finally fall off. The flowers are arranged singly in the axils of scale leaves, resupinate, 10–16 mm (0.39–0.63 in) long on a pedicel 3–5 mm (0.12–0.20 in) long. The sepals are linear, 8–12 mm (0.31–0.47 in) long. The petals are orange-red to scarlet, the standard petal diamond- to kite-shaped, 8–11 mm (0.31–0.43 in) long and 2.5–5 mm (0.098–0.197 in) wide, the wings narrowly oblong, 9–12.5 mm (0.35–0.49 in) long and 1.5–2.5 mm (0.059–0.098 in) wide and the keel narrowly egg-shaped, 9–13 mm (0.35–0.51 in) long. The ovary is stalked with 35–40 ovules. Flowering occurs throughout the year and the pods are elliptic and inflated, 17–25 mm (0.67–0.98 in) long and 5.5–10 mm (0.22–0.39 in) wide, including a 3–6 mm (0.12–0.24 in) beak.

== Taxonomy ==
Leptosema oxylobioides was first formally described in 1860 by Ferdinand von Mueller in an Essay on the plants collected by Mr Eugene Fitzalan during Lieut. Smith's Expedition to the Estuary of the Burdekin from specimens collected near "Port Sinclair". The specific epithet (oxylobioides) means 'Oxylobium - like'.

== Distribution and habitat ==
This species grows on sandy or gravelly soils, often on steep ridges, in open woodland or forest in the Cook, North Kennedy, South Kennedy, Mitchell and Port Curtis district, and between Mount Garnet and Gladstone east of the Great Dividing Range.

== Conservation status ==
Leptosema oxylobioides is listed as of "least concern" under the Queensland Government Nature Conservation Act 1992.
