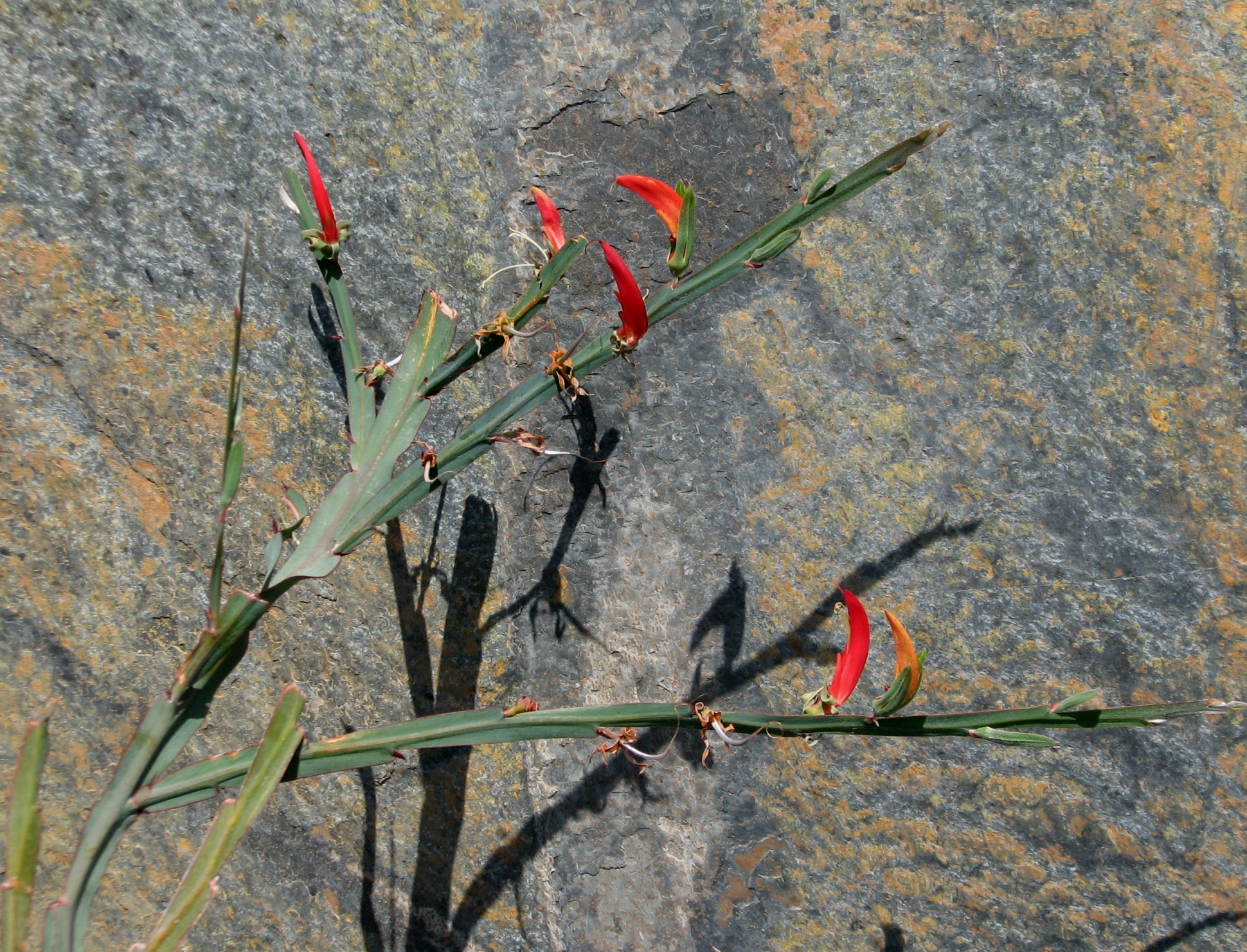
- Leptosema aphyllum

Scientific classification
- Kingdom: Plantae
- Clade: Tracheophytes
- Clade: Angiosperms
- Clade: Eudicots
- Clade: Rosids
- Order: Fabales
- Family: Fabaceae
- Subfamily: Faboideae
- Clade: Mirbelioids
- Genus: Leptosema; Benth. (1837)

Species
- 13; see text

Synonyms
- Burgesia F.Muell. (1859); Kaleniczenkia Turcz. (1853)

= Leptosema =

Genus of legumes

Leptosema is a genus of thirteen species of flowering plants from the legume family Fabaceae, all endemic to Australia. They are shrubs with photosynthetic stems, the leaves reduced to scales, mostly red or green flowers arranged singly or in small groups, each with a reduced standard petal and usually ten stamens.

== Description ==
Plants in the genus Leptosema are low shrubs, with flattened to terete, sometimes spiny, hairy branchlets. The stems are photosynthetic, the adult leaves reduced to scales. The flowers are arranged singly in the axils of upper scale-leaves, or in elongated racemes or in small panicles, sometimes in small racemes along the branchlets. The flowers are shades of red or green, but not pea-like, because the standard is equal to or shorter than the other petals and the keel is usually larger and more conspicuous than the other petals. There are usually ten stamens, roughly equal in length and free from each other. The ovary has up to 60 or more ovules and the pod is oval or elliptic to linear or cylindrical containing kidney shaped seeds lacking an aril. Leptosema is most closely related to Jacksonia except that the flowers are adapted for bird pollination, whereas Jacksonia species are mostly bee-pollinated.

== Taxonomy ==
The genus Leptosema was first formally described in 1837 by George Bentham in his Commentationes de Leguminosarum Generibus.

=== Accepted species ===
The following is a list of Letptosema species accepted by the Australian Plant Census as at April 2025:

- Leptosema aculeatum Crisp (W.A.)
- Leptosema anomalum (Ewart & Morrison) Crisp (W.A., N.T.)
- Leptosema aphyllum (Hook.) Crisp (W.A.)
- Leptosema bossiaeoides Benth. (N.T.)
- Leptosema cervicornu Crisp (W.A.)
- Leptosema chambersii F.Muell. (W.A., N.T., S.A.)
- Leptosema chapmanii Crisp (Qld.)
- Leptosema daviesioides (Turcz.) Crisp (W.A.)
- Leptosema macrocarpum (Benth.) Crisp (W.A.)
- Leptosema oxylobioides F.Muell. (Qld.)
- Leptosema tomentosum (Benth.) Crisp (W.A.)
- Leptosema uniflorum (R.Br. ex Benth.) Crisp (N.T.)
- Leptosema villosum Crisp (N.T.)
