= Leptosema bossiaeoides =

Scientific classification
- Kingdom: Plantae
- Clade: Tracheophytes
- Clade: Angiosperms
- Clade: Eudicots
- Clade: Rosids
- Order: Fabales
- Family: Fabaceae
- Subfamily: Faboideae
- Genus: Leptosema
- Species: L. bossiaeoides

Binomial name
- Leptosema bossiaeoides Benth.

Synonyms
- Brachysema bossiaeoides (Benth.) Benth.

Species of legume

Leptosema bossiaeoides is a species of flowering plant in the family Fabaceae and is endemic to the Northern Territory. It is a straggling, low-growing or prostrate shrub with flat, winged stems and branches, leaves reduced to narrowly elliptic scales, pale yellowish-green flowers, and oval, beaked pods.

== Description ==
Leptosema bossiaeoides is a straggling, low-growing or prostrate shrub with flat, winged, striated stems and branches up to 10 mm (0.39 in) wide. Its adult leaves are reduced to narrowly egg-shaped, channelled scales, 3–5 mm (0.12–0.20 in) long. The flowers are pale yellowish-green, and arranged in racemes of two to five flowers on a rachis up to 12 mm (0.47 in) long along the stems and branches, each flower on a pedicel 3–6 mm (0.12–0.24 in) long. The standard petal is 7–8 mm (0.28–0.31 in) long and about 3 mm (0.12 in) broad, the wings are awl-shaped, 8–9 mm (0.31–0.35 in) long and 1.5–2.0 mm (0.059–0.079 in) wide and the keel is elliptic, 9–10 mm (0.35–0.39 in) long. The ovary has about 4 ovules. Flowering occurs in most months, and the pods are oval, slightly inflated, about 7 mm (0.28 in) long and 4 mm (0.16 in) wide, including a beak about 2 mm (0.079 in) long.

== Taxonomy ==
Leptosema bossiaeoides was first formally described in 1837 by George Bentham in his Commentationes de Leguminosarum Generibus from specimens collected on Sim's Island by Allan Cunningham.

== Distribution and habitat ==
This species of Leptosema grows in shallow sand over sandstine in laterite in low woodland in the Arnhem Coast, Arnhem Plateau, Central Arnhem, Darwin Coastal, Gulf Coastal, Gulf Fall and Uplands, Northern Kimberley, Pine Creek bioregions of the Northern Territory.

== Conservation status ==
Leptosema bossiaeoides is listed as of "least concern" under the Northern Territory Government Territory Parks and Wildlife Conservation Act.

== External sources ==
Images
