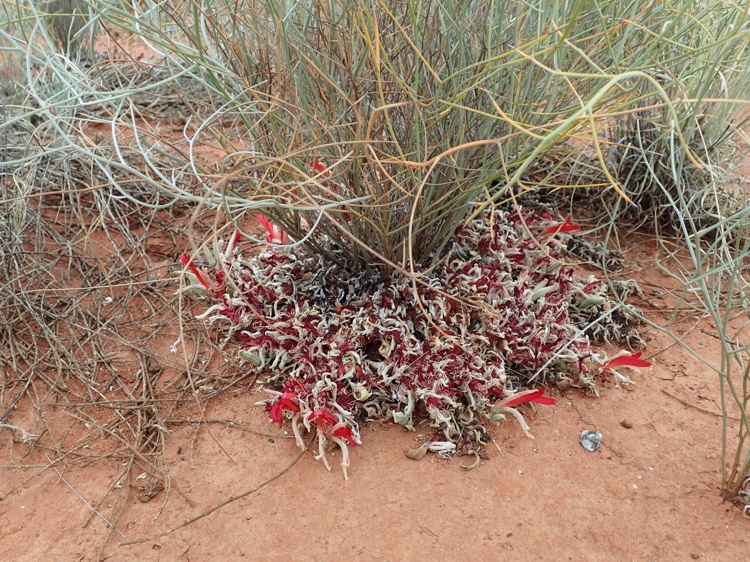
- In Uluru-Kata Tjuta National Park

Scientific classification
- Kingdom: Plantae
- Clade: Tracheophytes
- Clade: Angiosperms
- Clade: Eudicots
- Clade: Rosids
- Order: Fabales
- Family: Fabaceae
- Subfamily: Faboideae
- Genus: Leptosema
- Species: L. chambersii

Binomial name
- Leptosema chambersii F.Muell.

Synonyms
- Brachysema chambersii (F.Muell.) Benth.

= Leptosema chambersii =

Species of legume

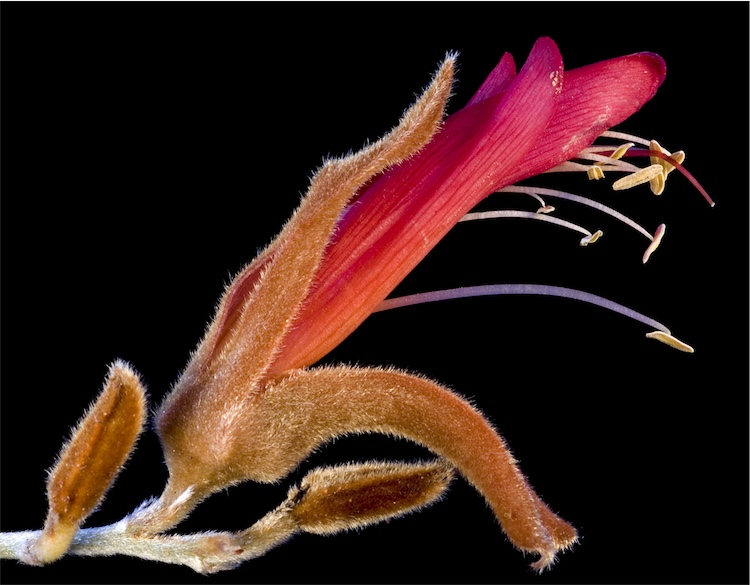
Flower detail in Matuwa Kurrara Kurrara National Park

Leptosema chambersii, commonly known as Chamber's leptosema, is a species of flowering plant in the family Fabaceae and is endemic to inland areas of western Australia. It is a low shrub growing in small, dense clumps, covered with silky hairs, spiny branchlets, leaves reduced to egg-shaped scales, red flowers and beaked, broadly elliptic pods.

== Description ==
Leptosema chambersii is a low shrub growing in small, dense clumps, with many tangled branches and branchlets, and that typically grows to up to 40 cm (16 in) high. Its adult leaves are reduced to scales about 1.5 mm (0.059 in) long. The flowers are resupinate, and borne in rosettes of 2 to 20 flowers at the base of the plant, each flower on a pedicel 5–20 mm (0.20–0.79 in) long with narrowly egg-shaped bracteoles 1.5–3.5 mm (0.059–0.138 in) long. The sepals are 28–34 mm (1.1–1.3 in) long and form a tube about 4 mm (0.16 in) long. The petals are red, the standard petal is enclosed in the sepals, 17–22 mm (0.67–0.87 in) long and 5–6 mm (0.20–0.24 in) broad, the wings are linear, 32–34 mm (1.3–1.3 in) long and 2–3 mm (0.079–0.118 in) wide with the keel protruding and 38–40 mm (1.5–1.6 in) long. The ovary is more or less sessile with about 60 ovules. Flowering mainly occurs between July and October, and the pods are sessile and beaked, 10–20 mm (0.39–0.79 in) long and 7–11 mm (0.28–0.43 in) wide including the beak.

== Taxonomy ==
Leptosema chambersii was first formally described in 1860 by Ferdinand von Mueller in his Essay on the plants collected by Mr Eugene Fitzalan during Lieut. Smith's Expedition to the Estuary of the Burdekin from specimens collected "between the rivers Stephenson and Finke" by John McDouall Stuart. The specific epithet (chambersii) honours James Chambers, "whose munificence the brilliant exploit was solely initiated and supported".

== Distribution and habitat ==
This species of Leptosema grows in on red sand on sand dunes and sandplains in hummock grassland, mainly dominated by Triodia basedowii in the Eremaean province of Western Australia, the southern half of the Northern Territory and the north-western corner of South Australia.

== Conservation status ==
Leptosema chambersii is listed as "not threatened" by the Government of Western Australia Department of Biodiversity, Conservation and Attractions.
