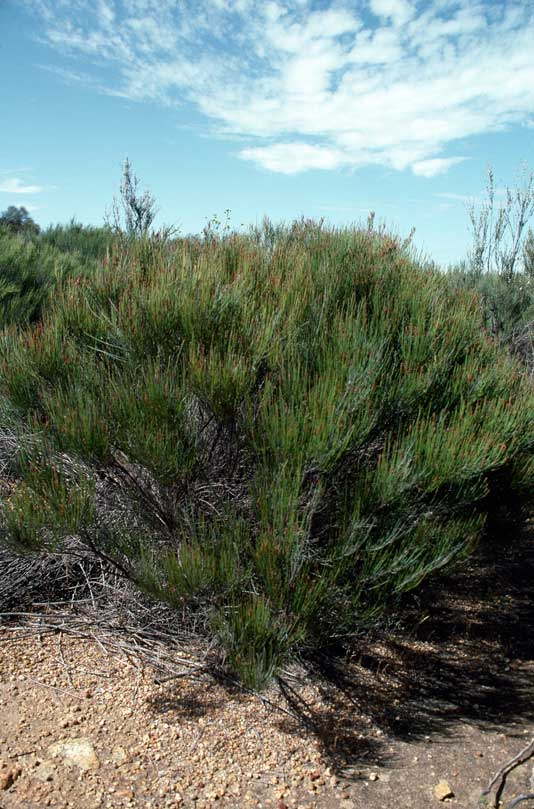
- Near Wongan Hills

Scientific classification
- Kingdom: Plantae
- Clade: Tracheophytes
- Clade: Angiosperms
- Clade: Eudicots
- Clade: Rosids
- Order: Fagales
- Family: Casuarinaceae
- Genus: Allocasuarina
- Species: A. campestris

Binomial name
- Allocasuarina campestris (Diels) L.A.S.Johnson

Synonyms
- List: Allocasuarina campestris (Diels) L.A.S.Johnson subsp. campestris; Casuarina campestris Diels; Casuarina campestris Diels subsp. campestris

= Allocasuarina campestris =

Species of flowering plant

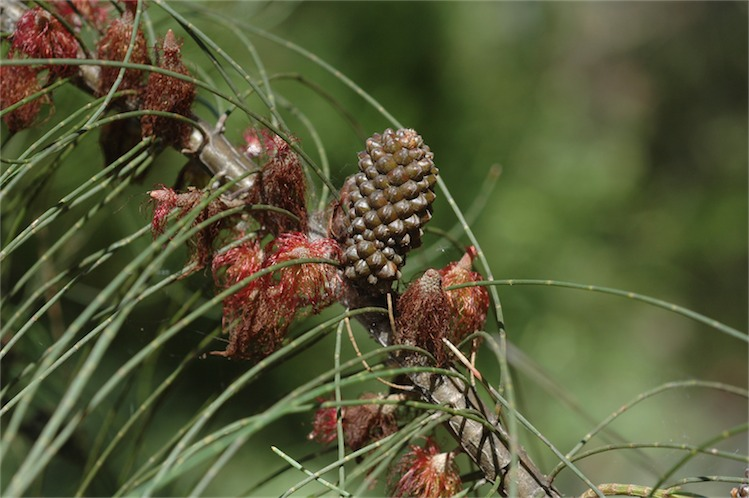
Young and mature female cones in the Australian National Botanic Gardens

Allocasuarina campestris is a species of flowering plant in the family Casuarinaceae and is endemic to the south-west of Western Australia. It is a dense, monoecious or dioecious shrub that has more or less erect branchlets, the leaves reduced to scales in whorls of seven to nine, the mature fruiting cones 19–42 mm (0.75–1.65 in) long containing winged seeds (samaras) 4.7–10 mm (0.19–0.39 in) long.

== Description ==
Allocasuarina campestris is a dense, erect, monoecious or dioecious shrub that typically grows to a height of 1–3 m (3 ft 3 in – 9 ft 10 in). Its branchlets are more or less erect, up to 200 mm (7.9 in) long, the leaves reduced to erect, scale-like teeth 0.3–1.2 mm (0.012–0.047 in) long, arranged in whorls of seven to nine, around the branchlets. The sections of branchlet between the leaf whorls (the "articles") are 6–13 mm (0.24–0.51 in) long and 0.6–1.2 mm (0.024–0.047 in) wide. Male flowers are arranged in spikes 4–28 mm (0.16–1.10 in) long, in whorls of 8.5 to 11 per centimetre (per 0.39 in.), the anthers 0.9–1 mm (0.035–0.039 in) long. Female cones are red to brown, covered with short, fine, white hairs when young, and are sessile or on a peduncle up to 5 mm (0.20 in) long. Mature cones are 19–42 mm (0.75–1.65 in) long and 10–17 mm (0.39–0.67 in) in diameter, the samaras black and 4.7–10 mm (0.19–0.39 in) long.

== Taxonomy ==
This species was first formally described in 1904 by Ludwig Diels who gave it the name Casuarina campestris in Botanische Jahrbücher für Systematik, Pflanzengeschichte und Pflanzengeographie, from specimens collected near Watheroo. It was reclassified in 1982 as Allocasuarina campestris by Lawrie Johnson in the Journal of the Adelaide Botanic Gardens. The specific epithet (campestris) means "pertaining to plains or flat areas, as opposed to hills and mountains".

== Distribution and habitat ==
Allocasuarina campestris is widespread in the south-west of Western Australia, from north of the Murchison River almost to the south coast near Ravensthorpe and to east of Esperance, where it grows on sandplains.
