= Michael Crisp =

Australian botanist

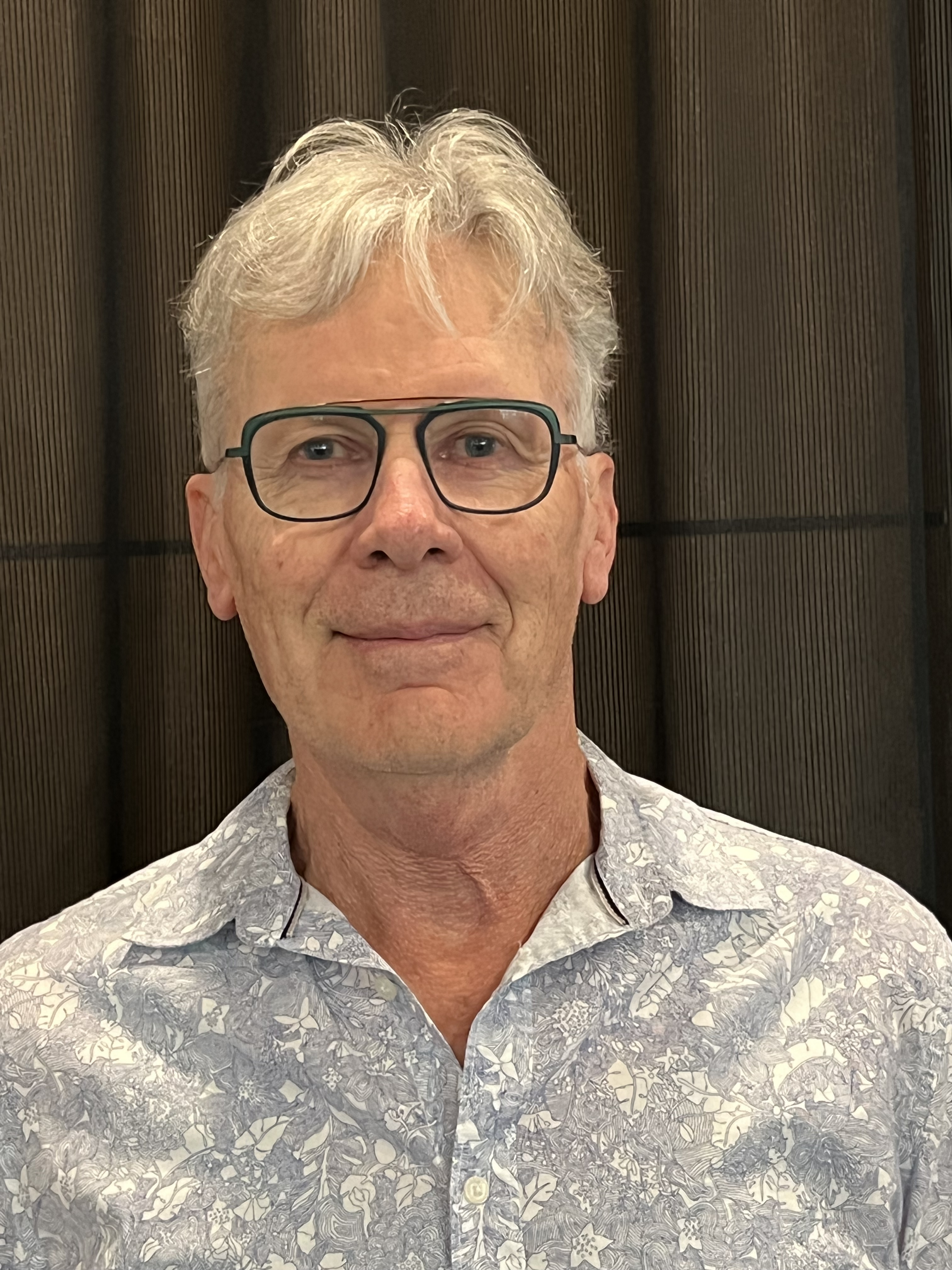
- Born: Michael Douglas Crisp; 1950 (age 75–76)
- Education: University of Adelaide
- Scientific career
- Workplaces: Australian National University
- Thesis: Long-term change in arid zone vegetation at Koonamore, South Australia (1976)
- Author abbrev. (botany): Crisp

Michael Douglas Crisp (born 1950) is an emeritus professor in the Research School of Biology at the Australian National University located in Canberra. In 1976, he gained a PhD from the University of Adelaide, studying long-term vegetation changes in arid zones of South Australia. In 2020, Crisp moved to Brisbane, where he has an honorary position at the University of Queensland. Together with colleagues, he revised various pea-flowered legume genera (Daviesia, Gastrolobium, Gompholobium, Pultenaea and Jacksonia).

He has made considerable contributions to biogeography, phylogeny and plant evolution.

== Some taxa authored ==
- See Category:Taxa named by Michael Crisp
