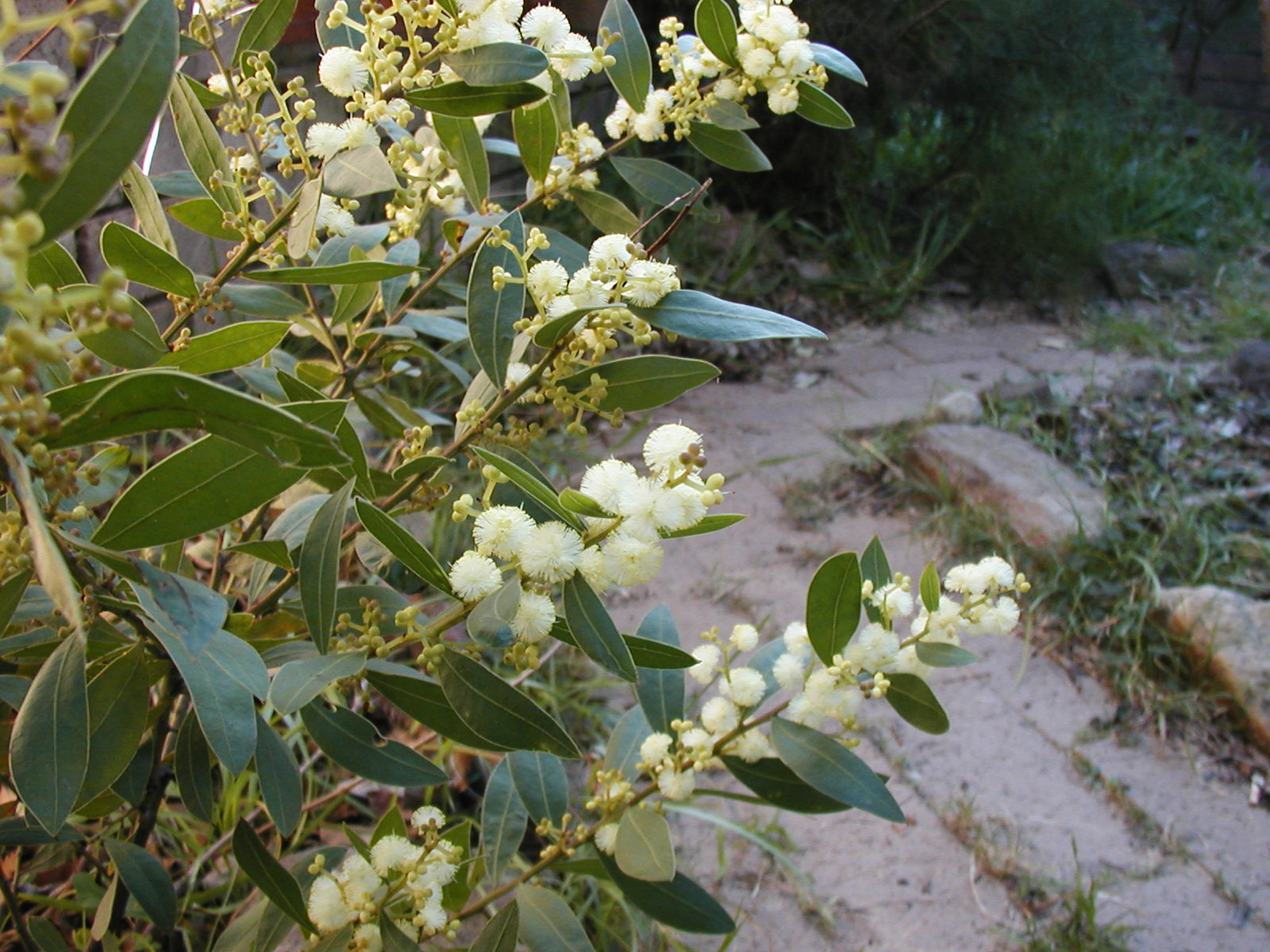

Scientific classification
- Kingdom: Plantae
- Clade: Tracheophytes
- Clade: Angiosperms
- Clade: Eudicots
- Clade: Rosids
- Order: Fabales
- Family: Fabaceae
- Subfamily: Caesalpinioideae
- Clade: Mimosoid clade
- Genus: Acacia
- Species: A. myrtifolia

Binomial name
- Acacia myrtifolia (Sm.) Willd.

Synonyms
- List: Acacia acutifolia Maiden & Blakely; Acacia marginata R.Br.; Acacia marginata var. angustata Meisn.; Acacia marginata var. brevifolia Regel; Acacia marginata R.Br. var. marginata; Acacia myrtifolia f. angustifolia Benth.; Acacia myrtifolia (Sm.) Willd. f. myrtifolia; Acacia myrtifolia f. normalis Benth. nom. inval.; Acacia myrtifolia var. angustifolia (Benth.) W.Fitzg.; Acacia myrtifolia var. major Meisn.; Acacia myrtifolia (Sm.) Willd. var. myrtifolia; Acacia pawlikowskyana Ohlend.; Acacia trigona A.DC.; Cuparilla myrtifolia (Sm.) Raf.; Mimosa marginata (R.Br.) Poir. nom. inval.; Mimosa myrtifolia Sm.; Phyllodoce myrtifolia (Sm.) Link; Racosperma myrtifolium (Sm.) Mart. nom. illeg.; Acacia amoena auct. non H.L.Wendl.: Bailey, F.M. (1900)

= Acacia myrtifolia =

Myrtle wattle

Species of plant

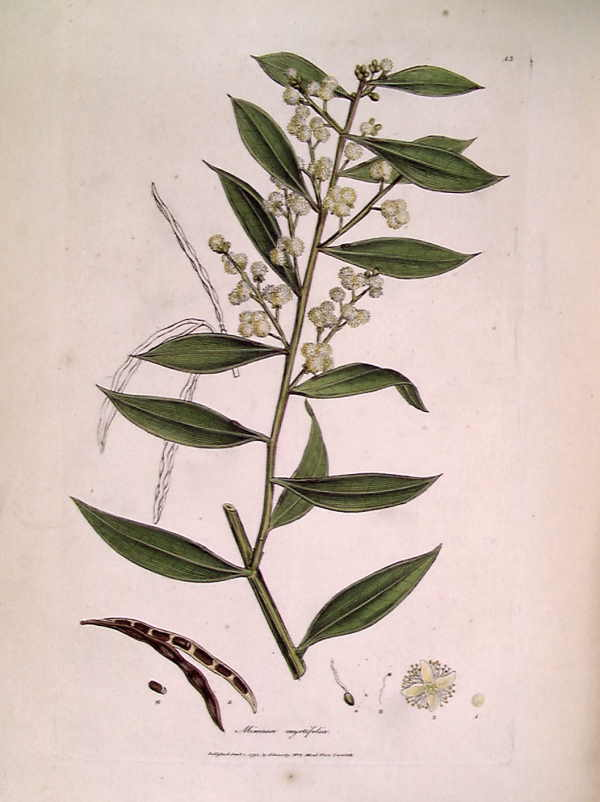
Illustration by James Sowerby

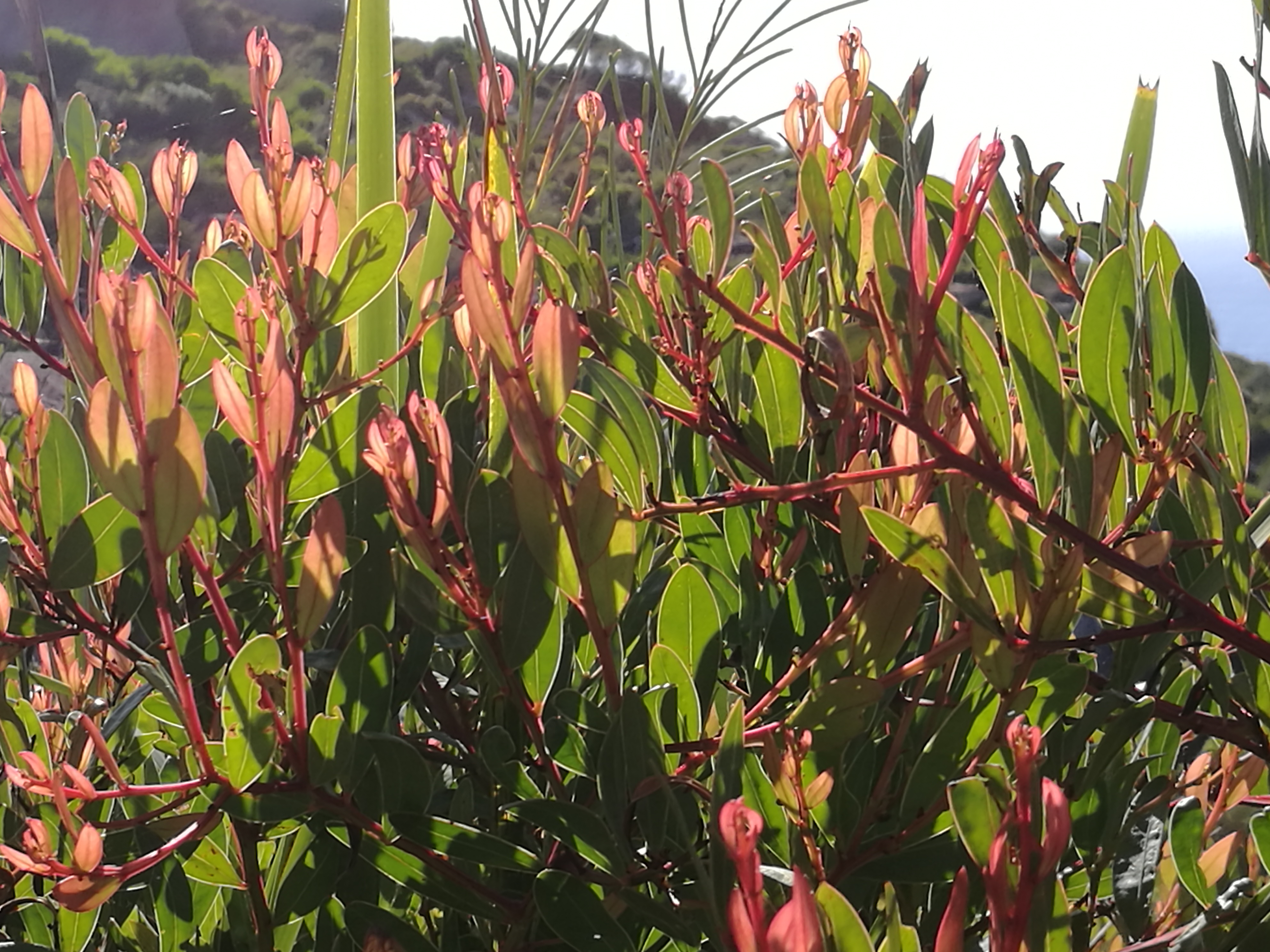
Habit

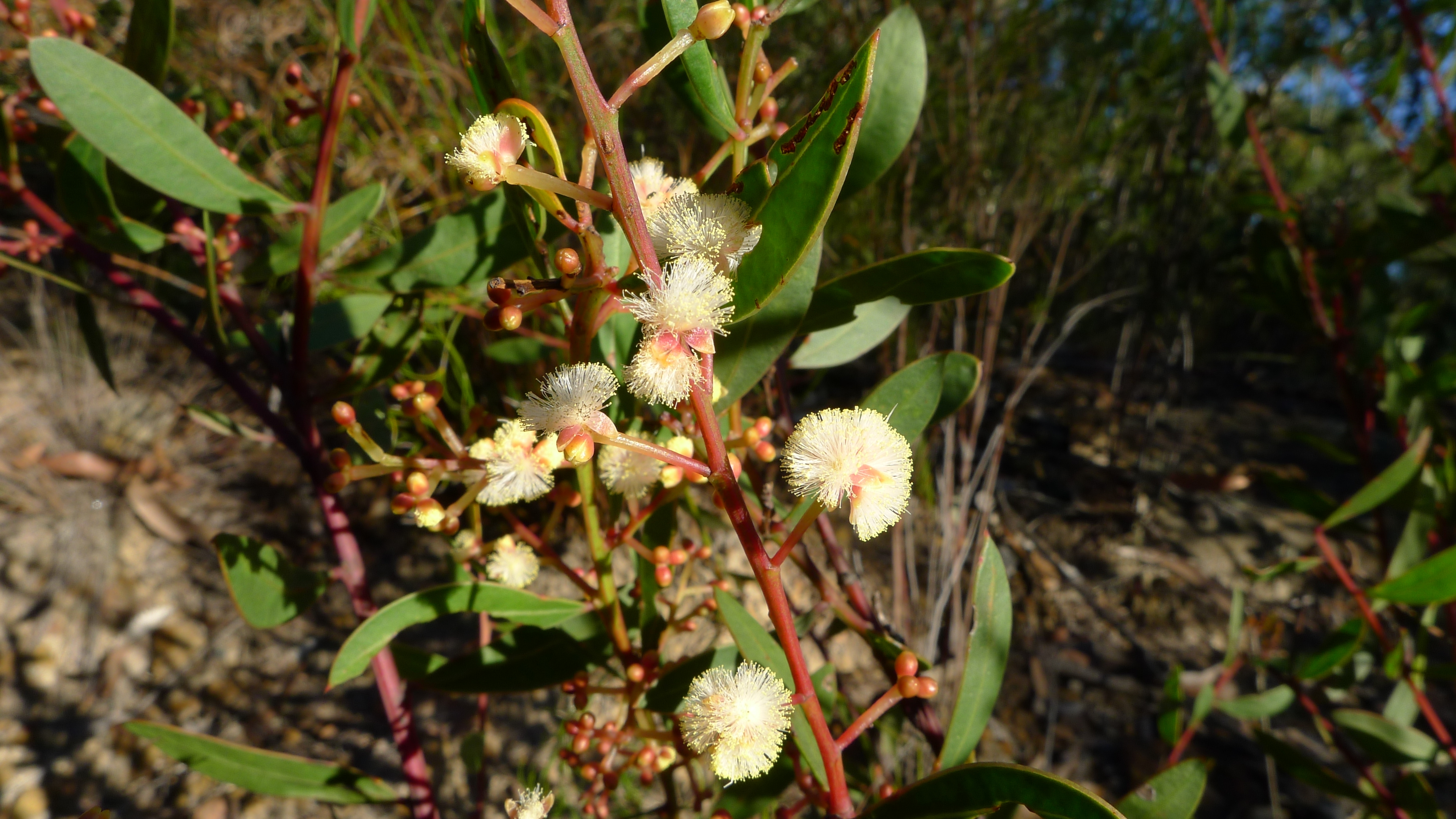
Flowers and foliage

Acacia myrtifolia, known colloquially as myrtle wattle, red stem wattle, red-stemmed wattle or South Australian silver wattle, is a species of flowering plant in the family Fabaceae, and is endemic to coastal or near-coastal areas of Australia. It is a glabrous, bushy shrub with its new shoots often red and angled, prominently ribbed, normally red branchlets, erect, commonly narrowly elliptic to lance-shaped or linear phyllodes, spherical heads of creamy yellow flowers and erect, linear, crusty to subwoody pods.

== Description ==
Acacia myrtifolia is a glabrous, bushy shrub that typically grows to a height of 0.5–3 m (1 ft 8 in – 9 ft 10 in) and 2–3 m (6 ft 7 in – 9 ft 10 in) with smooth grey bark, often red new shoots and angled, prominently ribbed, normally red branchlets. Its phyllodes are erect, commonly narrowly elliptic to lance-shaped with the narrower end towards the base, sometimes linear, usually 20–130 mm (0.79–5.12 in) long, 4–30 mm (0.16–1.18 in) wide, thick and leathery with the midrib and edge veins prominent. There is a gland mostly 0.5–2 mm (0.020–0.079 in) above the pulvinus. The flowers are borne in three to twenty spherical heads in racemes 10–60 mm (0.39–2.36 in) long on stout peduncles 3–12 mm (0.12–0.47 in) long. Each head has two to five, sometimes up to eight, usually creamy yellow flowers. Flowering occurs from May to December or January, with a peak usually between June and October, and the pods are erect, linear and curved, up to 90 mm (3.5 in) long, 3–5 mm (0.12–0.20 in) wide and crusty to subwoody and wavy with a thick marginal vein. The seeds are narrowly oblong, 3.5–4.5 mm (0.14–0.18 in) long, shiny brown or greyish brown with an aril on the end.

== Taxonomy ==
This species was first formally described in 1791 by James Edward Smith, who gave it the name Mimosa myrtifolia in the Transactions of the Linnean Society of London. In 1806, Carl Ludwig von Willdenow transferred the species to Acacia as A. myrtifolia in Species Plantarum.

It was one of the earliest plants described in the colony, having been illustrated by James Sowerby. The specific epithet (myrtifolia) means 'myrtle-leaved', derived from the Latin myrtus 'myrtle', and folium 'leaf'.

A. myrtifolia is part of the 'A. myrtifolia group' of Acacias along with eight other closely related species all found in Western Australia; Acacia celastrifolia, Acacia clydonophora, Acacia disticha, Acacia durabilis, Acacia heterochroa, Acacia nervosa, Acacia obovata and Acacia pygmaea.

== Distribution and habitat ==
Myrtle wattle is widespread and common in temperate southern Australia and occurs in all states of Australia, but not in the Northern Territory. It grows in sand, sand over laterite or on granite in forest, woodland, scrub or heath, often in coastal or near-coastal areas. In Western Australia it is found in the is found in the Avon Wheatbelt, Coolgardie, Esperance Plains, Jarrah Forest, Mallee, Swan Coastal Plain and Warren bioregions. It is also found in coastal areas of South Australia east of the Eyre Peninsula extending to coastal areas of Victoria, New South Wales and north into Queensland as far as Gladstone. It is also found in coastal areas of Tasmania.

Habitats where A. myrtifolia is found is mostly open forest, mixed woodlands, scrub or heath, usually in coastal or near-coastal locations. The distribution pattern of the shrub closely follows the combined distributions of Acacia subcaerulea and Acacia suaveolens.

== Use in horticulture ==
Acacia myrtifolia is one of the earliest native Australian plants to be cultivated in Europe. The species has also been cultivated in Australia but it is not widely used in gardens as many other Acacia species have more colourful flowers. It prefers well drained soils, full sun and will tolerate moderate frosts. If it is lightly pruned after flowering it will produce a busy growth habit.

If grown from seed, pre-treatment by soaking in boiling water or by scarification is required. Propagation from cuttings can also work.

The fast growing shrub is suitable for low maintenance gardens, roadside verges and large median strips as a wind-break, natural barrier or erosion control.
