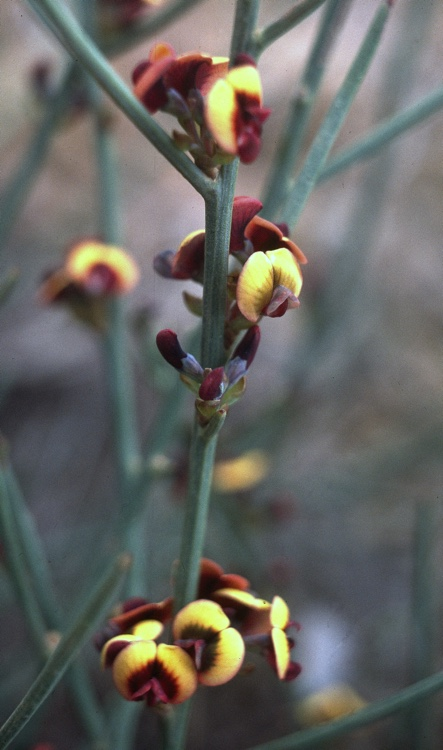
- Subspecies debilior near Eneabba

Conservation status
- Priority Four — Rare Taxa (DEC)

Scientific classification
- Kingdom: Plantae
- Clade: Tracheophytes
- Clade: Angiosperms
- Clade: Eudicots
- Clade: Rosids
- Order: Fabales
- Family: Fabaceae
- Subfamily: Faboideae
- Genus: Daviesia
- Species: D. debilior

Binomial name
- Daviesia debilior Crisp

= Daviesia debilior =

Species of flowering plant

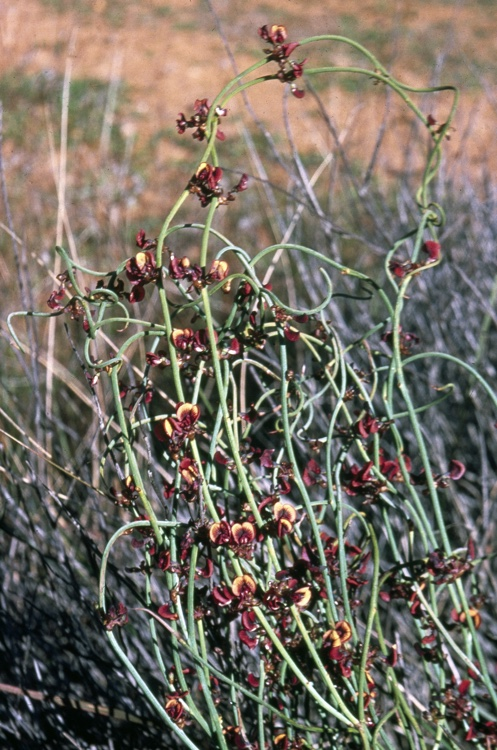
Subspecies sinuans near Wongan Hills

Daviesia debilior is a species of flowering plant in the family Fabaceae and is endemic to the south-west of Western Australia. It is a shrub with low-lying stems and many erect branchlets, scattered linear to scale-like phyllodes, and yellow, purplish, orange-pink and dark purplish flowers.

== Description ==
Daviesia debilior is a shrub with low-lying stems and many erect branchlets, and that typically grows up to 0.6 m (2 ft 0 in) high and 1.5 m (4 ft 11 in) wide. Its leaves are reduced to scattered, linear to scale-like phyllodes similar to the branchlets, up to 120 mm (4.7 in) long and 0.4–2 mm (0.016–0.079 in) wide. Juvenile phyllodes are narrowly spatula-shaped, 20–50 mm (0.79–1.97 in) long and 4–8 mm (0.16–0.31 in) wide. The flowers are arranged in groups of two to eight in leaf axils on a peduncle 1.0–2.5 mm (0.039–0.098 in) long, each flower on a thread-like pedicel 1–5 mm (0.039–0.197 in) long with egg-shaped bracts about 3 mm (0.12 in) long at the base. The sepals are 1.5–3 mm (0.059–0.118 in) long and joined at the base, forming a bell-shaped base, the two upper lobes joined for most of their length and the lower three triangular. The standard is broadly elliptic, 5.0–6.5 mm (0.20–0.26 in) long, 6–7 mm (0.24–0.28 in) wide and yellow with a purplish or red centre, the wings 5–6 mm (0.20–0.24 in) long and pinkish-orange, and the keel 4.0–5.5 mm (0.16–0.22 in) long and dark purplish-red. Flowering occurs from May to July and the fruit is a flattened, triangular pod 14–17 mm (0.55–0.67 in) long.

== Taxonomy and naming ==
Daviesia debilior was first formally described in 1982 by Michael Crisp in the journal Nuytsia from specimens collected by Charles Chapman near Eneabba in 1977. The specific epithet (debilior) means "weaker" or "more feeble", in comparison to the closely related Daviesia hakeoides.

In the same journal, Crisp described two subspecies and the names are accepted by the Australian Plant Census:

- Daviesia debilior Crisp subsp. debilior has gently upcurved branchlets and phyllodes, at least on the lower parts of the branchlets;
- Daviesia debilior subsp. sinuans Crisp has weakly upcurved, sinuous branchlets and all phyllodes reduced to minute scales.

== Distribution and habitat ==
This species of pea grows in heath between Eneabba, Darlington and Wongan Hills in the Avon Wheatbelt, Geraldton Sandplains and Jarrah Forest biogeographic regions of south-western Western Australia. Subspecies sinuans has a more restricted distribution further inland than the autonym.

== Conservation status ==
Subspecies debilior is classified as "Priority Two" by the Western Australian Government Department of Biodiversity, Conservation and Attractions, meaning that it is poorly known and from only one or a few locations, and subspecies sinuans "Priority Three" by the Government of Western Australia Department of Biodiversity, Conservation and Attractions, meaning that it is poorly known and known from only a few locations but is not under imminent threat.
