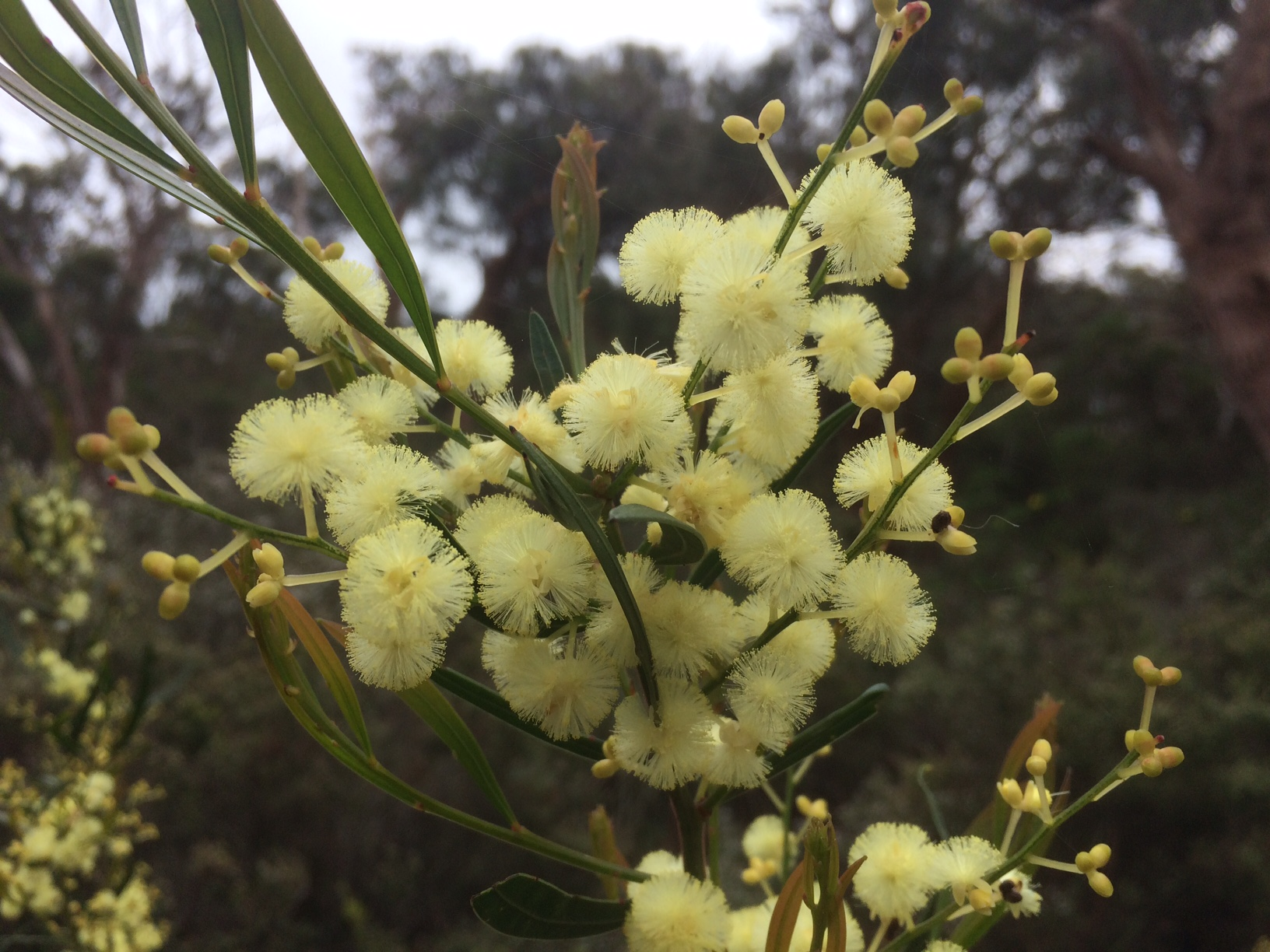
- Flowers

Scientific classification
- Kingdom: Plantae
- Clade: Tracheophytes
- Clade: Angiosperms
- Clade: Eudicots
- Clade: Rosids
- Order: Fabales
- Family: Fabaceae
- Subfamily: Caesalpinioideae
- Clade: Mimosoid clade
- Genus: Acacia
- Species: A. nervosa

Binomial name
- Acacia nervosa DC.
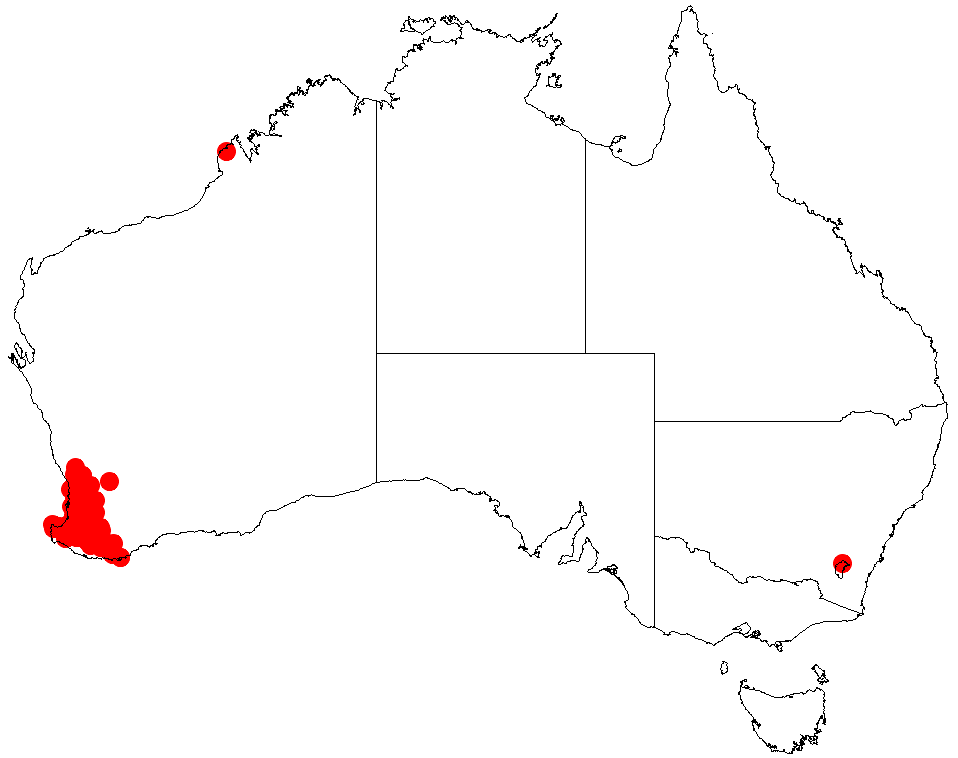
- Occurrence data from AVH

Synonyms
- Racosperma nervosum Pedley

= Acacia nervosa =

Rib wattle

Species of legume

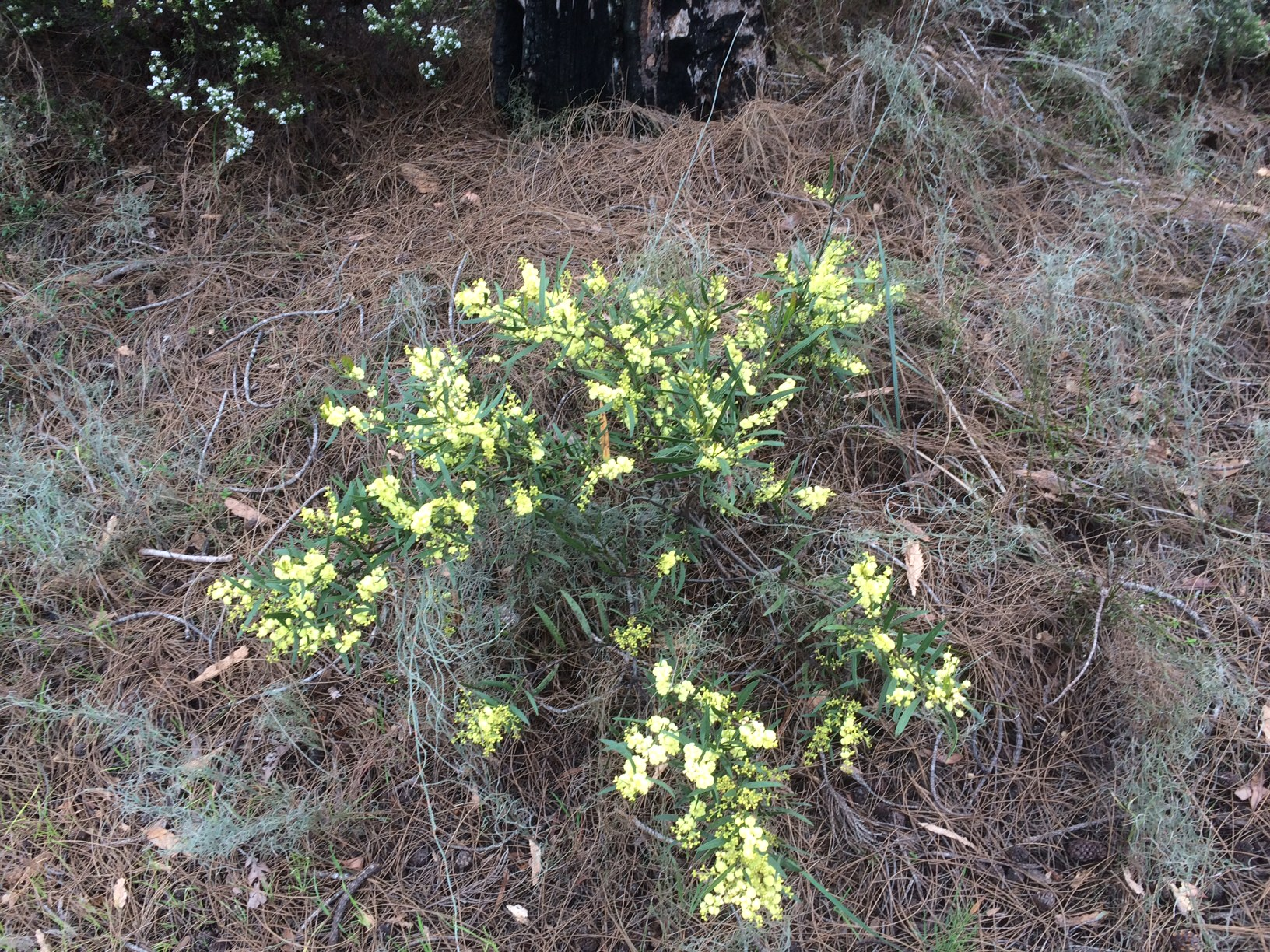
Sprawling habit

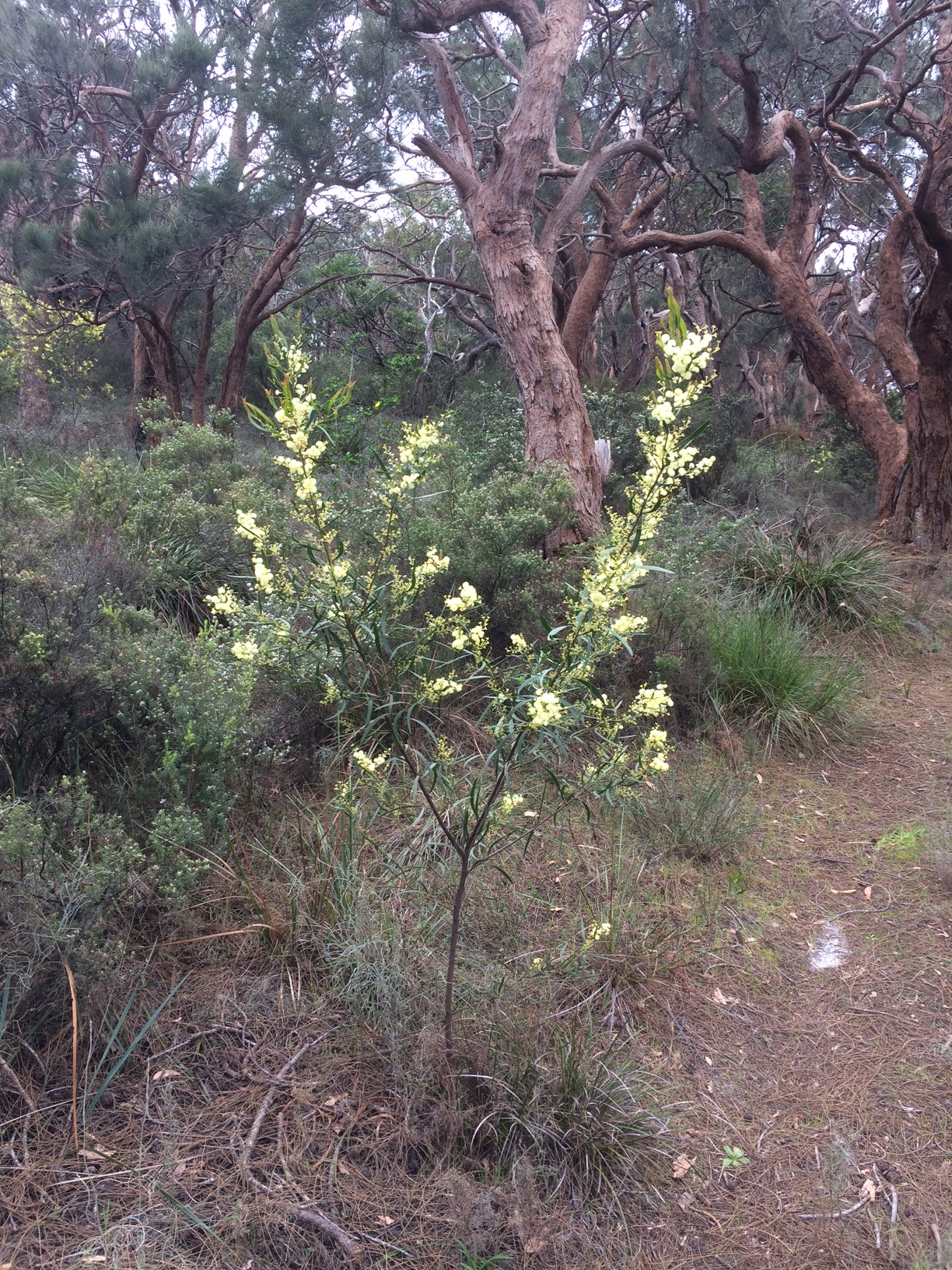
Upright habit

Acacia nervosa, commonly known as rib wattle or ribbed wattle is a species of flowering plant in the family Fabaceae, and is endemic to the south-west of Western Australia. It is a sometimes sprawling, glabrous subshrub with prominently ribbed branchlets, narrowly elliptic phyllodes, spherical heads of bright golden yellow flowers and narrowly oblong, more or less woody, dark brown pods.

== Description ==
Acacia nervosa is a glabrous, sometimes sprawling subshrub that typically grows to a height of 10–50 cm (3.9–19.7 in) and has a single or many stems arising from a woody rootstock. Its branchlets are prominently ribbed and covered with a white, powdery bloom. The phyllodes are narrowly elliptic, straight or slightly curved, 10–50 mm (0.39–1.97 in) long, 4–12 mm (0.16–0.47 in) wide with a more or less sharply pointed tip. The midrib and marginal veins are prominently, there is a gland 2–12 mm (0.079–0.472 in) above the base and spreading, slender, spiny stipules at the base of the phyllodes. The flowers are borne in two to four spherical heads on peduncles 5–18 mm (0.20–0.71 in) long, each head with 7 to 12 loosely arranged, bright golden yellow flowers. Flower occurs from June to October, and the pods are narrowly oblong, twisted, up to 50 mm (2.0 in) long, 8–9 mm (0.31–0.35 in) wide, more or less woody and dark brown with thick margins. The seeds are oblong to more or less circular, 3.5–4 mm (0.14–0.16 in) long, shiny greyish brown with a dark brown aril.

== Taxonomy ==
Acacia nervosa was first formally described in 1825 by Augustin Pyramus de Candolle in his Prodromus Systematis Naturalis Regni Vegetabilis from specimens collected in 1801 in Geographe Bay by Louis de Freycinet, a member of the Nicolas Baudin expedition. The specific epithet (nervosa) means 'abounding in veins', referring to the prominent veins in the phyllodes of this species.

The species belongs to the Acacia myrtifolia group along with other dwarf members including Acacia obovata and Acacia pygmaea.

== Distribution and habitat ==
Rib wattle grows in laterite, gravelly sand or sandy clay, frequently near watercourses, in woodland or forest from Mogumber to Lake Muir and Cape Naturaliste with outlying occurrences near Tammin, Katanning and Mount Barker in the Avon Wheatbelt, Jarrah Forest and Swan Coastal Plain bioregions of south-western Western Australia.

== Cultivation ==
Acacia nervosa is available commercially in seed form or as a seedling. The hardy plant is dieback resistant. Seeds have to be pretreated with hot water prior to planting and the seed will take about four weeks to germinate.

== See also ==
- List of Acacia species
