= Calytrix cravenii =

Scientific classification
- Kingdom: Plantae
- Clade: Tracheophytes
- Clade: Angiosperms
- Clade: Eudicots
- Clade: Rosids
- Order: Myrtales
- Family: Myrtaceae
- Genus: Calytrix
- Species: C. cravenii

Binomial name
- Calytrix cravenii Nge & K.R.Thiele

Species of flowering plant

Calytrix cravenii is a species of flowering plant in the myrtle family Myrtaceae and is endemic to the south-west of Western Australia. It is an erect, open shrub with linear leaves and clusters of white flowers with 18 to 29 white stamens in several rows.

== Description ==
Calytrix cravenii is an erect, open shrub that typically grows to a height of up to 0.5–2 m (1 ft 8 in – 6 ft 7 in). The leaves are linear, 3–11 mm (0.12–0.43 in) long, 0.3–0.9 mm (0.012–0.035 in) wide on a petiole 0.5–1 mm (0.020–0.039 in) long. The flowers are borne on a peduncle 0.5–0.8 mm (0.020–0.031 in) long with green to light brown bracteoles 2.0–3.5 mm (0.079–0.138 in) long. The floral tube is 2.5–4 mm (0.098–0.157 in) long and has 5 ribs. The sepals are 0.6–1.1 mm (0.024–0.043 in) long and 0.2–8 mm (0.0079–0.3150 in) wide and lack awns. The petals are white, about 6 mm (0.24 in) long and 1.5–1.7 mm (0.059–0.067 in) wide with 18 to 29 white stamens, the longest filaments 4–5 mm (0.16–0.20 in) long. Flowering occurs from early September to early December.

== Taxonomy ==
Calytrix cravenii was first formally described in 2017 by Francis Jason Nge and Kevin R. Thiele in the journal Nuytsia from specimens inadvertently designated as Lhotskya scabra by Lyndley Craven in Australian Systematic Botany. The specific epithet (cravenii) honours Lyndley Craven.

== Distribution and habitat ==
This species of Calytrix is found in a range of habitats, often on sandplains, between Dongara, Wongan Hills and Narrogin in the Avon Wheatbelt, Geraldton Sandplains Jarrah Forest and Swan Coastal Plain bioregions of south-western Western Australia.

== Conservation status ==
This star flower is listed as "not threatened" by the Government of Western Australia Department of Biodiversity, Conservation and Attractions.
