= Acacia celastrifolia =

Glowing wattle

Scientific classification
- Kingdom: Plantae
- Clade: Tracheophytes
- Clade: Angiosperms
- Clade: Eudicots
- Clade: Rosids
- Order: Fabales
- Family: Fabaceae
- Subfamily: Caesalpinioideae
- Clade: Mimosoid clade
- Genus: Acacia
- Species: A. celastrifolia

Binomial name
- Acacia celastrifolia Benth.
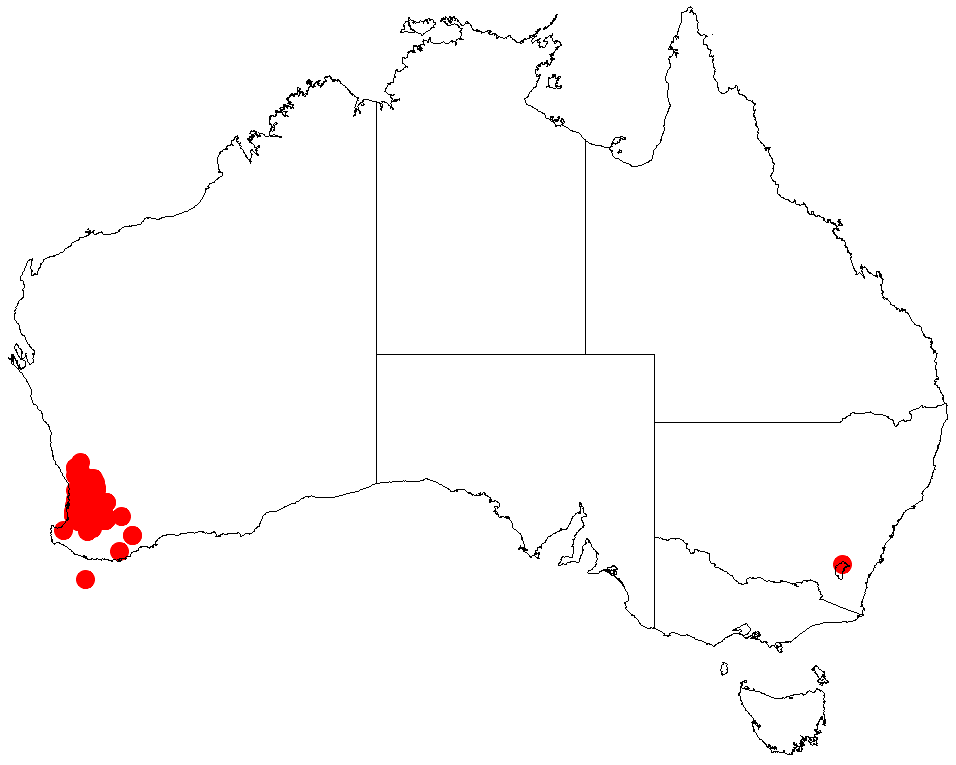
- Occurrence data from AVH

Synonyms
- Acacia myrtifolia f. celastrifolia (Benth.) Benth.; Acacia myrtifolia var. celastrifolia (Benth.) Benth.; Racosperma celastrifolium (Benth.) Pedley

Species of legume

Habit in Wandoo National Park

Acacia celastrifolia, commonly known as glowing wattle or Celastrus-leaved acacia, is a species of flowering plant in the family Fabaceae and is endemic to the southwest of Western Australia. It is a bushy, glabrous shrub or tree with finely ribbed branchlets, egg-shaped to lance-shaped phyllodes with the narrower end towards the base, spherical heads of bright light golden flowers, and erect, linear, crust-like to more or less woody pods.

== Description ==
Acacia celastrifolia is a bushy, glabrous shrub or tree that typically grows to a height of 1 to 3 metres (3 to 10 ft) and has finely ribbed branchlets, usually covered with a white, powdery bloom. Its phyllodes are egg-shaped to lance-shaped with the narrower end towards the base, or elliptic, 30–70 mm (1.2–2.8 in) long and 15–35 mm (0.59–1.38 in) wide. The phyllodes are leathery with several prominent veins and a prominent gland 5–20 mm (0.20–0.79 in) above the pulvinus. The flowers are borne in 10 to 20 spherical heads in racemes 30–120 mm (1.2–4.7 in) long, each head with two or three bright, light golden flowers. Flowering occurs from April to August and the pods are erect, linear, more or less straight to slightly curved, up to 120 mm (4.7 in) long and 3–4 mm (0.12–0.16 in) wide and crusty to more or less woody. The seeds are oblong, usually glossy brown, 4–5 mm (0.16–0.20 in) long with an aril on the end.

== Taxonomy ==
Acacia celastrifolia was first formally described in 1842 by George Bentham in Hooker's London Journal of Botany from specimens collected in the Swan River Colony by James Drummond. The specific epithet (celastrifolia) means 'Celastrus-leaved'.

Acacia celastrifolis is part of the Acacia myrtifolia group and is also closely related to A. clydonophora.

== Distribution and habitat ==
Glowing wattle grows in sandy to gravelly lateritic or granitic soils, often in Eucalyptus accedens woodland and occurs from north of New Norcia to York and south to Wagin and south of Dinninup in the Avon Wheatbelt, Jarrah Forest and Swan Coastal Plain bioregions of south-western Western Australia.

== See also ==
- List of Acacia species
