= Hakea chromatropa =

Conservation status
- Priority One — Poorly Known Taxa (DEC)

Scientific classification
- Kingdom: Plantae
- Clade: Tracheophytes
- Clade: Angiosperms
- Clade: Eudicots
- Order: Proteales
- Family: Proteaceae
- Genus: Hakea
- Species: H. chromatropa

Binomial name
- Hakea chromatropa A.S.George & R.M.Barker

Species of shrub found in Southwest Australia

Hakea chromatropa is a species of shrub found in Southwest Australia. The distribution is restricted to an area around Wongan Hills, where it is found on gravelly loam in open shrubland. The flowers are white or creamy, becoming pink, and without a scent.

== Description ==
Hakea chromatropa is a non lignotuberous bushy shrub to 2.5 m (8 ft) tall and 2 m (7 ft) wide with finely fissured bark. Small branches are covered with short forked matted hairs and longer simple hairs. Mid-green leaves are rigid, egg-shaped 18–55 mm (0.7–2 in) long and 8–20 mm (0.3–0.8 in) wide narrowing toward the stem. The edge of the leaf has definite "teeth" widening toward the apex, 1–5 teeth or entire terminating with a stiff sharp point on each margin. The inflorescence appear in leaf axils with a barely discernible stalk. Each flower having a stalk 4–7 mm (0.2–0.3 in) long, covered in long soft white hairs. The bracts surrounding the flower heads are egg-shaped, very concave with flat longish hairs up to 1.5 mm (0.06 in) long. Each inflorescence has 20-26 unscented creamy-white flowers turning a deep pink with age. Fruit are broadly egg-shaped more enlarged on the lower side 20–24 mm (0.8–0.9 in) long and 10–13 mm (0.4–0.5 in) wide. The surface is covered with small corky pyramid-shaped protrusions. The flowering period is between July and the beginning of October.

== Taxonomy and naming ==
Hakea chromatropa was first formally described in 2007 by Alex George and Robyn Mary Barker and published in Nuytsia. 17:159-164. The specific epithet (chromatropa) is derived from the Ancient Greek words chroma meaning "colour" and trope "a turn" or "a turning" referring to the species habit of flowers changing colour as they age. The new taxon was described by Alex George and Robyn Barker from dried specimens obtained in 2006 and recorded as having no scent. However in a television interview, Alex George stated that Hakea chromatropa "has a lovely scent like vanilla".

== Distribution and habitat ==
Hakea chromatropa has a restricted distribution in four localities in the northern Jarrah Forest and north- western Avon Wheatbelt. Grows in open shrubland with sparse mallee and wandoo eucalyptus woodland on gravelly loam. The new taxon was described from flowering specimens obtained in 2006.

== Conservation status ==
Hakea chromatropa is listed as "Priority One" by the Government of Western Australia Department of Parks and Wildlife, meaning that it is known from only one or a few locations which are potentially at risk.
