= Acacia pygmaea =

Dwarf rock wattle

Conservation status
- Endangered (EPBC Act)

Scientific classification
- Kingdom: Plantae
- Clade: Tracheophytes
- Clade: Angiosperms
- Clade: Eudicots
- Clade: Rosids
- Order: Fabales
- Family: Fabaceae
- Subfamily: Caesalpinioideae
- Clade: Mimosoid clade
- Genus: Acacia
- Species: A. pygmaea

Binomial name
- Acacia pygmaea Maslin

Species of legume

Acacia pygmaea, commonly known as the dwarf rock wattle, is a shrub of the genus Acacia and the subgenus Phyllodineae that is endemic to south western Australia.

== Description ==
The erect single-stemmed shrub typically grows to a height of 0.3 to 0.5 metres (1.0 to 1.6 ft). The dwarf subshrub has prominently ribbed and glabrous branchlets with shallowly triangular stipules with a length of around 0.5 mm (0.020 in). Like most species of Acacia it has phyllodes rather than true leaves. The thin green phyllodes are crowded on the branchlets with an elliptic to obovate shape and a length of 20 to 30 mm (0.79 to 1.18 in) and a width of 9 to 13 mm (0.35 to 0.51 in) with one or sometimes two main nerves and a few obscure lateral nerves. It blooms from October to March and produces white-cream flowers that age to an orange colour.

== Taxonomy ==
It belongs to the Acacia myrtifolia group and is closely related to Acacia disticha and seemingly related to Acacia nervosa and Acacia obovata.

== Distribution ==
It is native to a small area in the Wheatbelt region of Western Australia where it is commonly found in crevices at the summit of ridges growing in laterite based soils. It has a limited range around Wongan Hills where it is situated along three adjacent ridges around Mount Matilda and Mount O'Brien across a length of about 8 km (5.0 mi) with a few populations and a total number of 129 individual plants recorded in 1997. It is usually a part of open Eucalyptus ebbanoensis mallee over open heathland communities composed of Allocasuarina campestris, Banksia pulchella, Banksia hewardiana and Persoonia divergens.

== See also ==
- List of Acacia species
