= Wongan Hills =

Low hills in Western Australia

Wongan Hills is a range of low flat-topped hills in the Avon Wheatbelt bioregion of Western Australia. It is located at 30°48′S 116°37′E, in the Shire of Wongan–Ballidu.

== History ==
The range was first recorded in 1836 by Surveyor General of Western Australia John Septimus Roe. The area was settled by the 1900s (decade), and in 1911 the town of Wongan Hills was established and named after the range.

== Etymology ==
"Wongan" is derived from the Indigenous Australian name "wangan-katta", "wankan" and "woongan". "Katta" is known to mean "hill", but the meaning of "wongan" is uncertain. It may be related to "kwongan", an indigenous word for sandplain, or "whispering", in which case "wongan katta" would mean "whispering hills".

== Flora and fauna ==
The hills are biologically significant because they contain the largest remaining single area of natural vegetation in northern parts of the wheatbelt.

The hills are home to remnant woodlands of salmon gum (Eucalyptus salmonophloia), York gum (Eucalyptus loxophleba), gimlet (Eucalyptus salubris), and silver mallet (Eucalyptus falcata), and low forest of jam (Acacia acuminata), plant communities were once widespread but now rare in the Wheatbelt.

Plants endemic to the Wongan Hills include Acacia botrydion, Acacia pharangites, Acacia pygmaea, Banksia bella, Eremophila ternifolia, Philotheca wonganensis, and Chenopodium aciculare.

A species of dryandra is endemic to the locality, referred to by the epithet published by Alex George for his description of Dryandra wonganensis. The same author described a new, possibly rare species of hakea he collected at Wongan Hills; the distribution range of Hakea chromatropa is also restricted to nearby regions. George thought this remarkable enough to note the fact that this region was settled shortly after colonisation, with a prolific botanical collector nearby, but it still revealed a new taxon. He also described a rare verticordia, the Wongan featherflower (Verticordia staminosa subsp. staminosa) discovered by Harry Butler on a granite outcrop.

A study of the area in 1982, published in a series of articles in Nuytsia, described eight unknown species of plants.

The hills are home to 90 species of birds.

== Protected areas ==
There are several protected areas in the hills:

- Wongan Hills Nature Reserve (4.17 km^{2}), established 1975
- Elphin Nature Reserve (1.98 km^{2}), established 1977
- Rogers Nature Reserve (3.41 km^{2}), established 1985
- Fowler Gully Nature Reserve (2.3 km^{2}), established 1993
- Unnamed WA51093 Nature Reserve (5.58 km^{2}), established 2011
- Unnamed WA52103 Conservation Park (6.95 km^{2}), established 2016

Elphin Nature Reserve and the two unnamed protected areas are contiguous. The others are separated from one another by unprotected lands.
