= Acacia botrydion =

Conservation status
- Priority Four — Rare Taxa (DEC)

Scientific classification
- Kingdom: Plantae
- Clade: Tracheophytes
- Clade: Angiosperms
- Clade: Eudicots
- Clade: Rosids
- Order: Fabales
- Family: Fabaceae
- Subfamily: Caesalpinioideae
- Clade: Mimosoid clade
- Genus: Acacia
- Species: A. botrydion

Binomial name
- Acacia botrydion Maslin
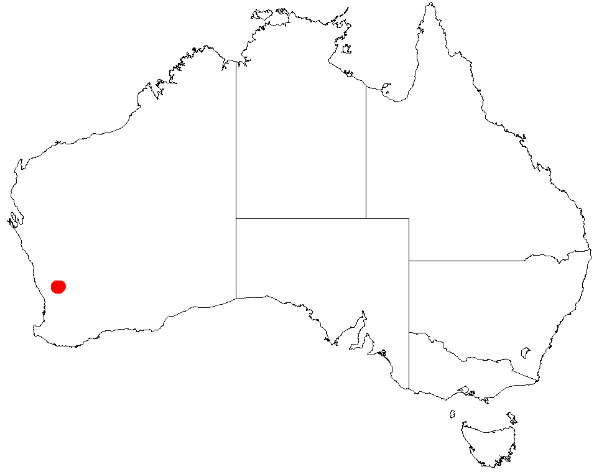
- Occurrence data from AVH

Synonyms
- Acacia semicircinalis Maiden & Blakely p.p.; Racosperma botrydion (Maiden) Pedley

Species of legume

Acacia botrydion is a species of flowering plant in the family Fabaceae and is endemic to the Wongan Hills area in the south-west of Western Australia. It is an intricately branched, open shrub with spiny branchlets, elliptic to widely elliptic phyllodes, spherical heads of light golden-yellow flowers, and thinly crust-like, curved or coiled pods.

== Description ==
Acacia botrydion is an intricately branched, open shrub that typically grows to a height of 0.3–1.5 m (1 ft 0 in – 4 ft 11 in) and 3 m (9.8 ft) wide, and has spiny branches. Its phyllodes are elliptic to widely elliptic, more or less wavy, 9–15 mm (0.35–0.59 in) long, 4–12 mm (0.16–0.47 in) wide and slightly sharply pointed. The flowers are borne in one or two spherical head in axils, on peduncles about 10 mm (0.39 in) long. Each head has 30 to 40 light golden–yellow flowers. Flowering occurs from July to September and the pods are curved or coiled, thinly crust-like, reddish brown, up to 40 mm (1.6 in) long and 4 mm (0.16 in) wide with inflated oblong, brown seeds 3–4 mm (0.12–0.16 in) long with an aril on the end.

== Taxonomy ==
Acacia botrydion was first formally described in 1982 by Bruce Maslin in the journal Nuytsia from specimens he collected about 12.5 km (7.8 mi) north-west of Wongan Hills township towards Piawaning in 1975. The specific epithet (botrydion) refers to the flower heads which are bunched at the ends of the branches.

== Distribution and habitat ==
This species of wattle is fairly common on lateritic hills in mallee, often associated with species of Eucalyptus, Melaleuca and Phebalium, and is only known from the Wongan Hills area in the Avon Wheatbelt bioregion of south-western Western Australia.

== Conservation status ==
Acacia botrydion is listed as "Priority Four" by the Government of Western Australia Department of Biodiversity, Conservation and Attractions, meaning that is rare or near threatened.

== See also ==
- List of Acacia species
