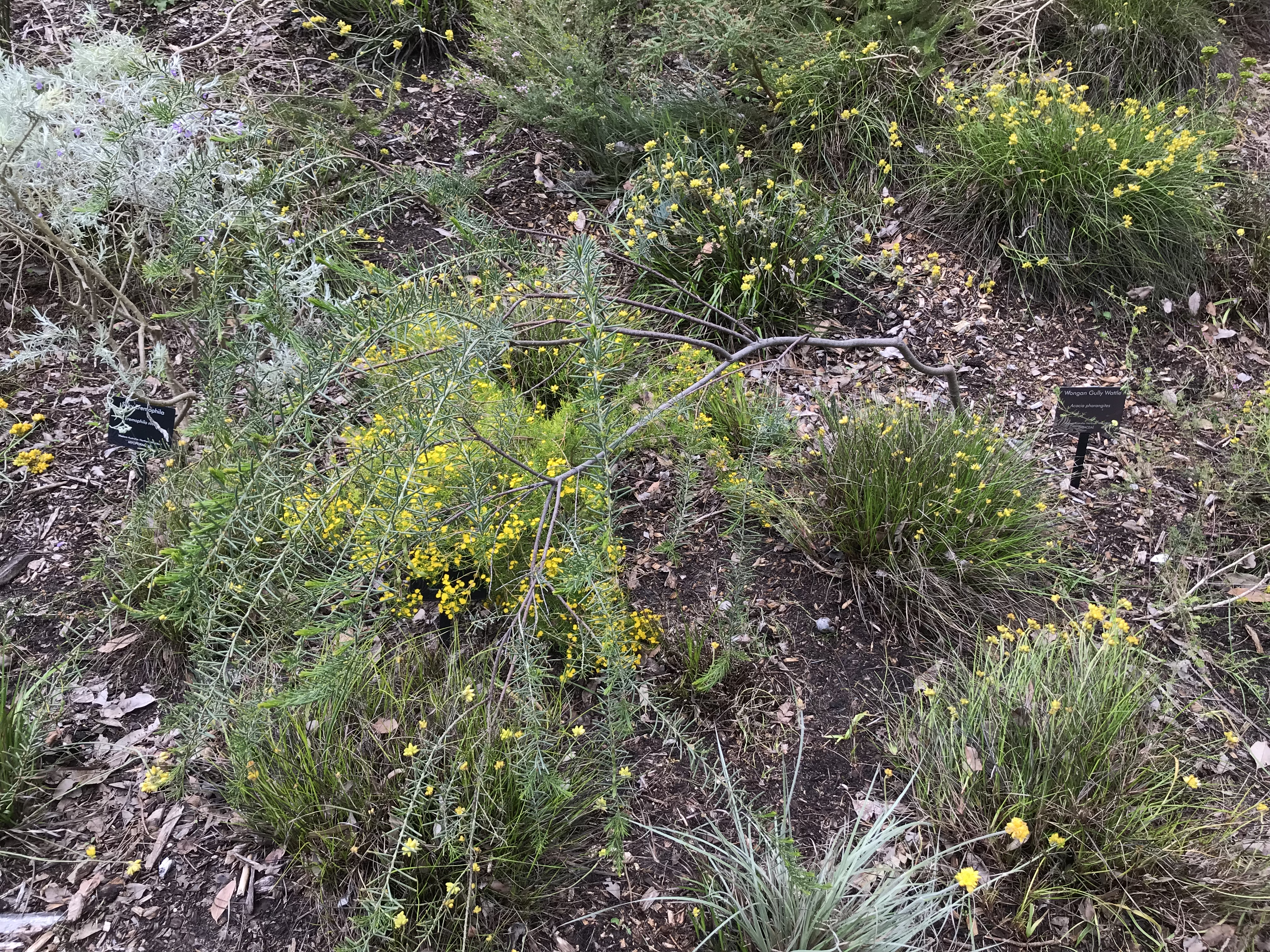

Conservation status
- Endangered (EPBC Act)

Scientific classification
- Kingdom: Plantae
- Clade: Tracheophytes
- Clade: Angiosperms
- Clade: Eudicots
- Clade: Rosids
- Order: Fabales
- Family: Fabaceae
- Subfamily: Caesalpinioideae
- Clade: Mimosoid clade
- Genus: Acacia
- Species: A. pharangites

Binomial name
- Acacia pharangites Maslin
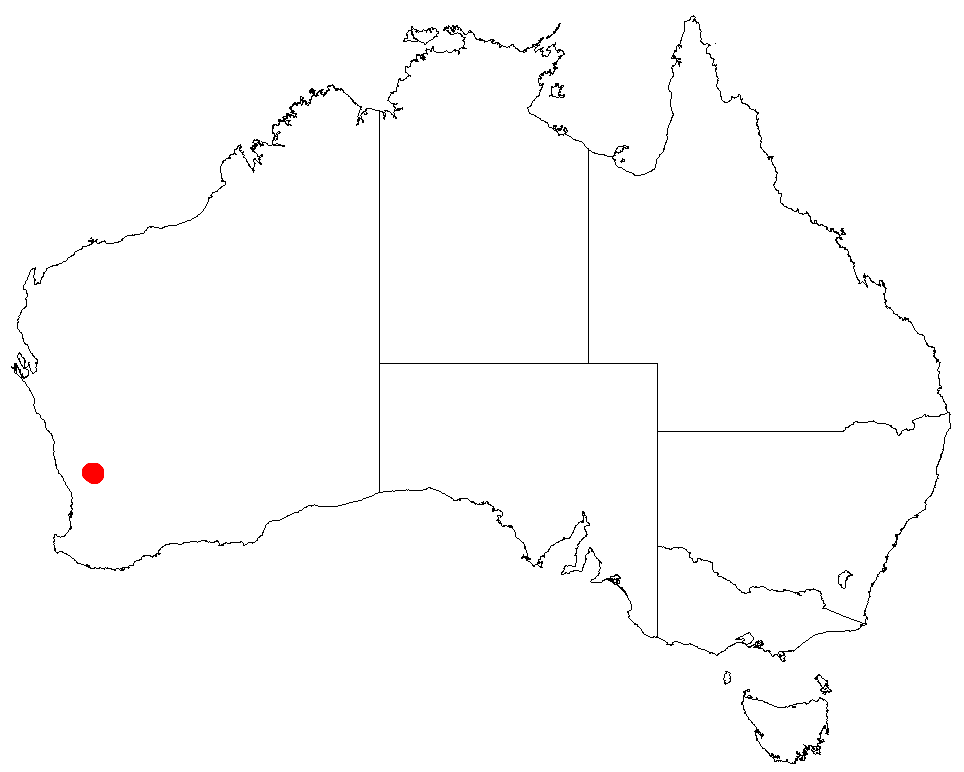
- Occurrence data from AVH

= Acacia pharangites =

Wongan gully wattle

Species of legume

Acacia pharangites, commonly known as Wongan gully wattle, is a shrub of the genus Acacia and the subgenus Plurinerves that is endemic to the Wongan Hills of south western Australia and is listed as endangered according to the Environment Protection and Biodiversity Conservation Act 1999.

== Description ==
The spindly open shrub typically grows to a height of 1.5 to 3 metres (5 to 10 ft) and has glabrous branchlets that can be covered in a fine white powdery coating toward the extremities and have scarring along the length by the by raised stem-projections where phyllodes once were located. Like most species of Acacia it has phyllodes rather than true leaves. The rigid, pungent, glabrous grey-green phyllodes are erect with a cylindrical shape and are straight to slightly curved. The phyllodes have a length of 1.5 to 5 cm (0.59 to 1.97 in) and a diameter of about 1 mm (0.039 in) with seven smooth longitudinal nerves. It blooms in August and produces yellow flowers. The inflorescences occur singly or in pairs on a raceme that is about 0.5 mm (0.020 in) in length. The obloid shaped flower-heads are 7 to 10 mm (0.28 to 0.39 in) in length and contain about 25 golden coloured flowers. The thinly leathery, glabrous seed pods that form after flowering have a powdery white coating with a linear shape but are raised over each of the seeds on alternating sides. The pods are up to 7 cm (2.8 in) in length and about 4 mm (0.16 in) wide and contain glossy black seeds with an elliptic shape that are 3 to 4 mm (0.12 to 0.16 in) long with a yellow coloured aril.

== Taxonomy ==
Th species was first formally described by the botanist Bruce Maslin in 1982 as a part of the work Studies in the genus Acacia (Leguminosae: Mimosoideae). Acacia species of the Wongan Hills, Western Australia as published in the journal Nuytsia. It was reclassified in 2003 by Leslie Pedley as Racosperma pharangites then returned to genus Acacia in 2005. The shrub superficially resembles Acacia tetanophylla.

== Distribution ==
It is native to a small area in the Wheatbelt region of Western Australia where it is commonly situated in gullies growing in clay soils over and around areas of greenstone. It has a limited distribution in the Wongan Hills where it is usually a part of mixed scrubland communities. It is known from only two populations consisting of 49 mature plants in total found in the Shire of Wongan-Ballidu in an area of remnant natural vegetation where an estimated ninety five percent of native vegetation has been cleared for agricultural purposes within the Shire as a whole. One population is located on private property and holds forty seven percent of mature plants the other population is found in a nature reserve and contains the remainder of the mature plants.

== See also ==
- List of Acacia species
