= Acacia durabilis =

Scientific classification
- Kingdom: Plantae
- Clade: Tracheophytes
- Clade: Angiosperms
- Clade: Eudicots
- Clade: Rosids
- Order: Fabales
- Family: Fabaceae
- Subfamily: Caesalpinioideae
- Clade: Mimosoid clade
- Genus: Acacia
- Species: A. durabilis

Binomial name
- Acacia durabilis Maslin
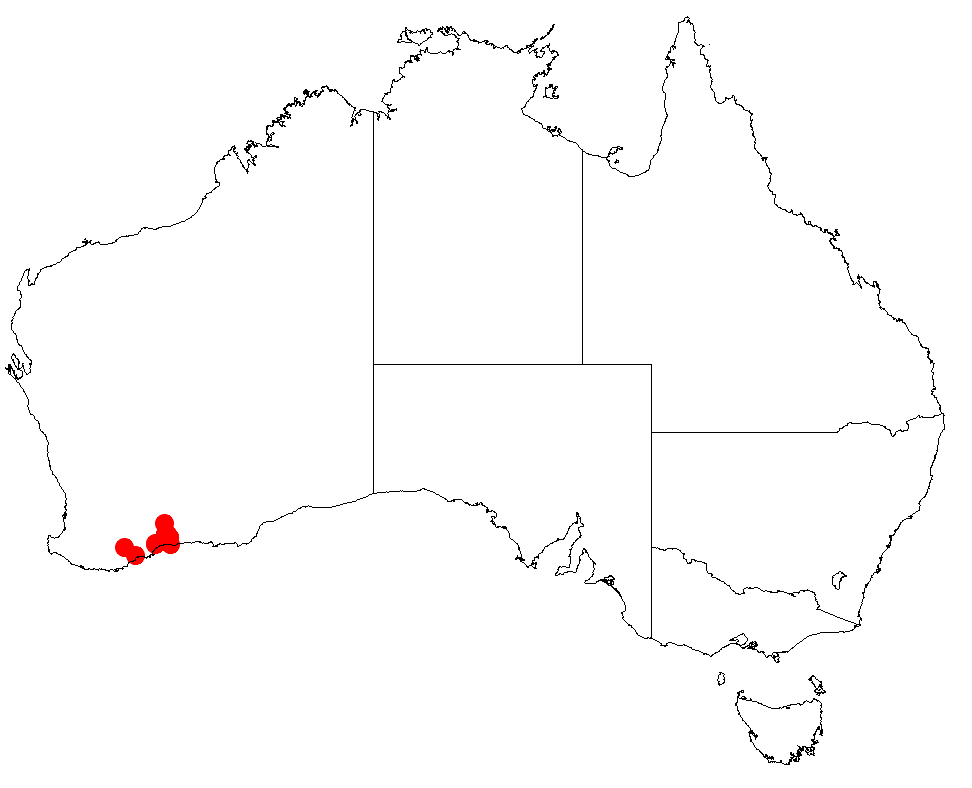
- Occurrence data from AVH

Synonyms
- Racosperma durabile (Maslin) Pedley

Species of legume

Habit on the Ravensthorpe Range, north of Ravensthorpe

Acacia durabilis is a species of flowering plant in the family Fabaceae and is endemic to the south of Western Australia. It is a spreading, open glabrous shrub with prominently striated branchlets, sharply pointed elliptic phyllodes, spherical heads of cream-coloured to pale yellow flowers, and narrowly oblong, crust like to almost woody pods.

== Description ==
Acacia durabilis is a spreading, moderately open, glabrous, single-stemmed shrub that typically grows to a height of 0.7–2 m (2 ft 4 in – 6 ft 7 in). It has terete, prominently striated branchlets covered with a white, powdery bloom. Its phyllodes are elliptic, mostly 15–40 mm (0.59–1.57 in) long, 15–30 mm (0.59–1.18 in) wide, leathery and sharply pointed with a prominent midvein. There are hard, pointed stipules 7–10 mm (0.28–0.39 in) long at the base of the phyllodes. The flowers are borne in a spherical head in axils on a peduncle 15–25 mm (0.59–0.98 in) long, the heads with 6 to 9 cream-coloured to pale yellow flowers. Flowering occurs from October to December or from January to April, and the pods are narrowly oblong and twisted, crust like to almost woody, up to 60 mm (2.4 in) long and 6–8 mm (0.24–0.31 in) wide. The seeds are elliptic, about 4 mm (0.16 in) long and glossy brown with a small aril.

== Taxonomy ==
Acacia durabilis was first formally described in 1995 by the Bruce Maslin in the journal Nuytsia from specimens he collected near Mount Desmond, about 11 km (6.8 mi) south of Ravensthorpe in 1971. The specific epithet (durabilis) means 'lasting' or 'enduring', referring to the "persistent stipules which are prominent on the plant, especially where phyllodes have shed.

== Distribution and habitat ==
This species of wattle is most common in the Ravensthorpe Range between Mount Desmond and Kundip where it grows on ridges and hillsides, in rocky clay or sandy clay in open mallee scrub or low woodland in the Esperance Plains bioregion of southern Western Australia.

== Conservation status ==
Acacia durabilis is listed as 'Not threatened' by the Government of Western Australia Department of Biodiversity, Conservation and Attractions.

== See also ==
- List of Acacia species
