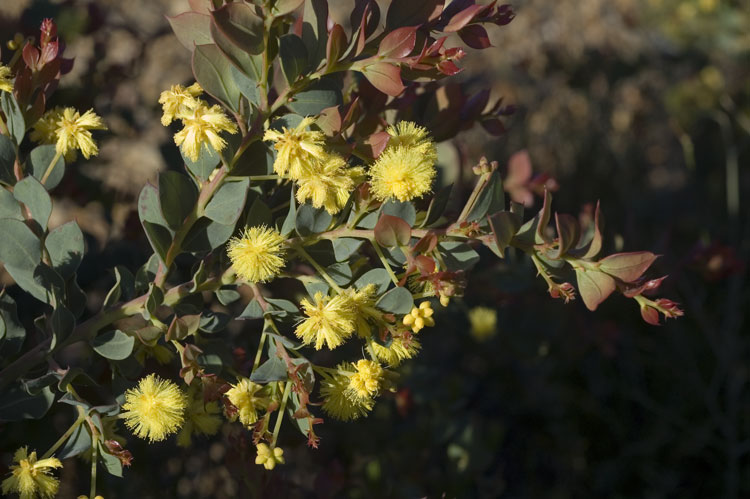
- Subspecies heterochroa

Scientific classification
- Kingdom: Plantae
- Clade: Tracheophytes
- Clade: Angiosperms
- Clade: Eudicots
- Clade: Rosids
- Order: Fabales
- Family: Fabaceae
- Subfamily: Caesalpinioideae
- Clade: Mimosoid clade
- Genus: Acacia
- Species: A. heterochroa

Binomial name
- Acacia heterochroa Maslin
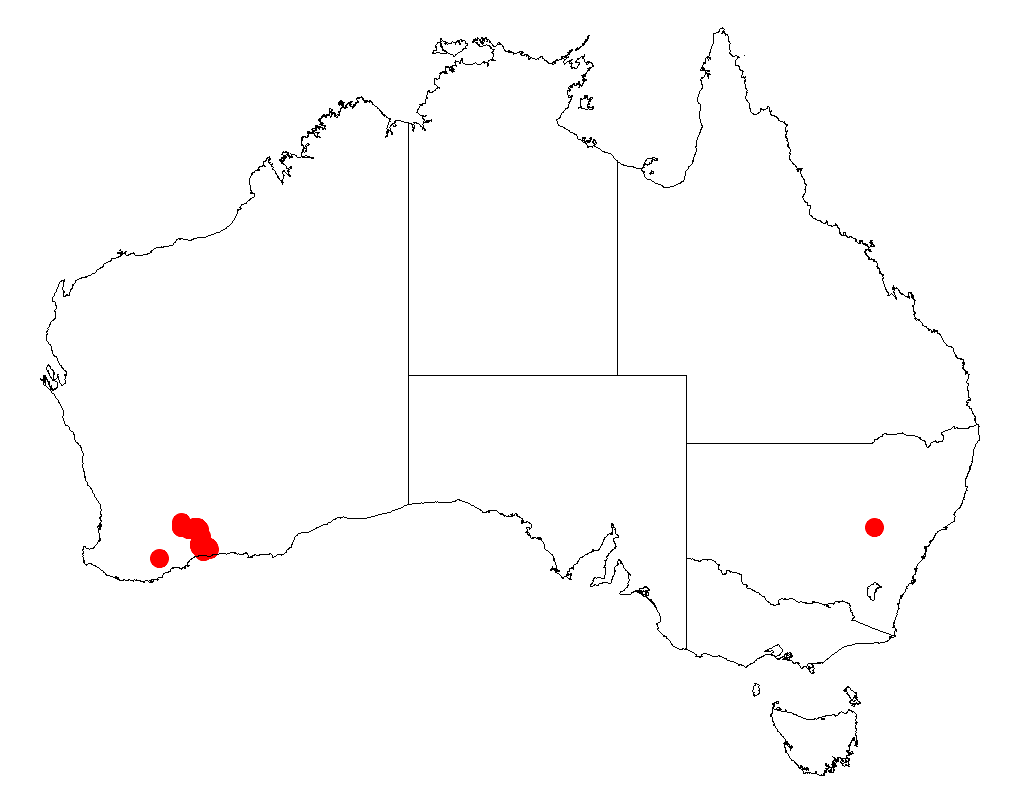
- Occurrence data from AVH

Synonyms
- Racosperma heterochroa (Maslin) Pedley

= Acacia heterochroa =

Species of legume

Acacia heterochroa is a species of flowering plant in the family Fabaceae and is endemic to the south-west of Western Australia. It is a spindly open, or dense spreading, glabrous shrub with elliptic to more or less egg-shaped, or almost circular phyllodes, spherical heads of bright lemon yellow flowers and erect, linear, curved pods.

== Description ==
Acacia heterochroa is a spindly open, or dense spreading, glabrous shrub that typically grows to a height of 0.5–1.5 m (1 ft 8 in – 4 ft 11 in) and has ribbed, terete branchlets that have a light, powdery bloom. Its new shoots, young peduncles and flower buds are reddish. Its phyllodes are elliptic to more or less egg-shaped, sometimes with the narrower end towards the base, or almost circular, triangular to Δ-shaped, 10–35 mm (0.39–1.38 in) long, 10–25 mm (0.39–0.98 in) wide and wavy with a more or less sharply pointed tip. The phyllodes are more or less leathery, grey-green to almost glaucous with the midrib and edge veins prominent. The flowers are borne in spherical heads on peduncles 5–25 mm (0.20–0.98 in) long, each head large with 5 to 12 loosely arranged bright lemon yellow flowers. Flowering occurs from April to December, and the pods are erect, linear, curved, up to 65 mm (2.6 in) long, 3–4 mm (0.12–0.16 in) wide and leathery to crusty to somewhat woody, puplish red when young, drying black apart from the thick, wavy edges. The seeds are oblong, 3.5–4.0 mm (0.14–0.16 in) long and glossy brown with an aril on the end.

== Taxonomy ==
Acacia heterochroa was first formally described in 1995 by Bruce Maslin in the journal Nuytsia from specimens he collected at the northern end of the Ravensthorpe Range south-east of Mount Short. The specific epithet (heterochroa) means 'different coloured', referring to the contasting colours of the stems, phyllodes, new shoots, heads and young pods of this species.

In the same journal, Maslin described two subspecies of Acacia heterochroa, and the names are accepted by the Australian Plant Census:

- Acacia heterochroa Maslin subsp. heterochroa has elliptic phyllodes with some tending egg-shaped, sometimes broadly elliptic or almost circular, 15–35 mm (0.59–1.38 in) long and 10–25 mm (0.39–0.98 in), the heads with 8 to 12 flowers.
- Acacia heterochroa Maslin subsp. robertii has unequal triangular to Δ-shaped phyllodes 10–25 mm (0.39–0.98 in) long and 10–15 mm (0.39–0.59 in), the heads with 5 or 6 flowers. The subspecies epithet robertii honours Robert Frederick Maslin, the author's brother, who discovered the subspecies and collected the type.

== Distribution and habitat ==
Acacia heterochroa occurs in the Ravensthorpe and Holt Rock districts of south in the Esperance Plains and Mallee bioregions of south-western Western Australia.

- Subspecies heterochroa grows in a variety of habitats on ridgelines or moderately exposed gentle slopes in tall dense to low open mallee scrub, and is common in the Ravensthorpe Range from Mount Short to near the Elverdton mine.
- Subspecies robertii grows in lateritic gravel in woodland or heath in scattered locations in the Holt Rock district, about 100 km (62 mi) north of subsp. heterochroa.

== Conservation status ==
Acacia heterochroa subsp. heterochroa is listed as "not threatened", but subsp. robertii is listed as "Priority Two" by the Western Australian Government Department of Biodiversity, Conservation and Attractions, meaning that it is poorly known and from only one or a few locations.

== See also ==
- List of Acacia species
