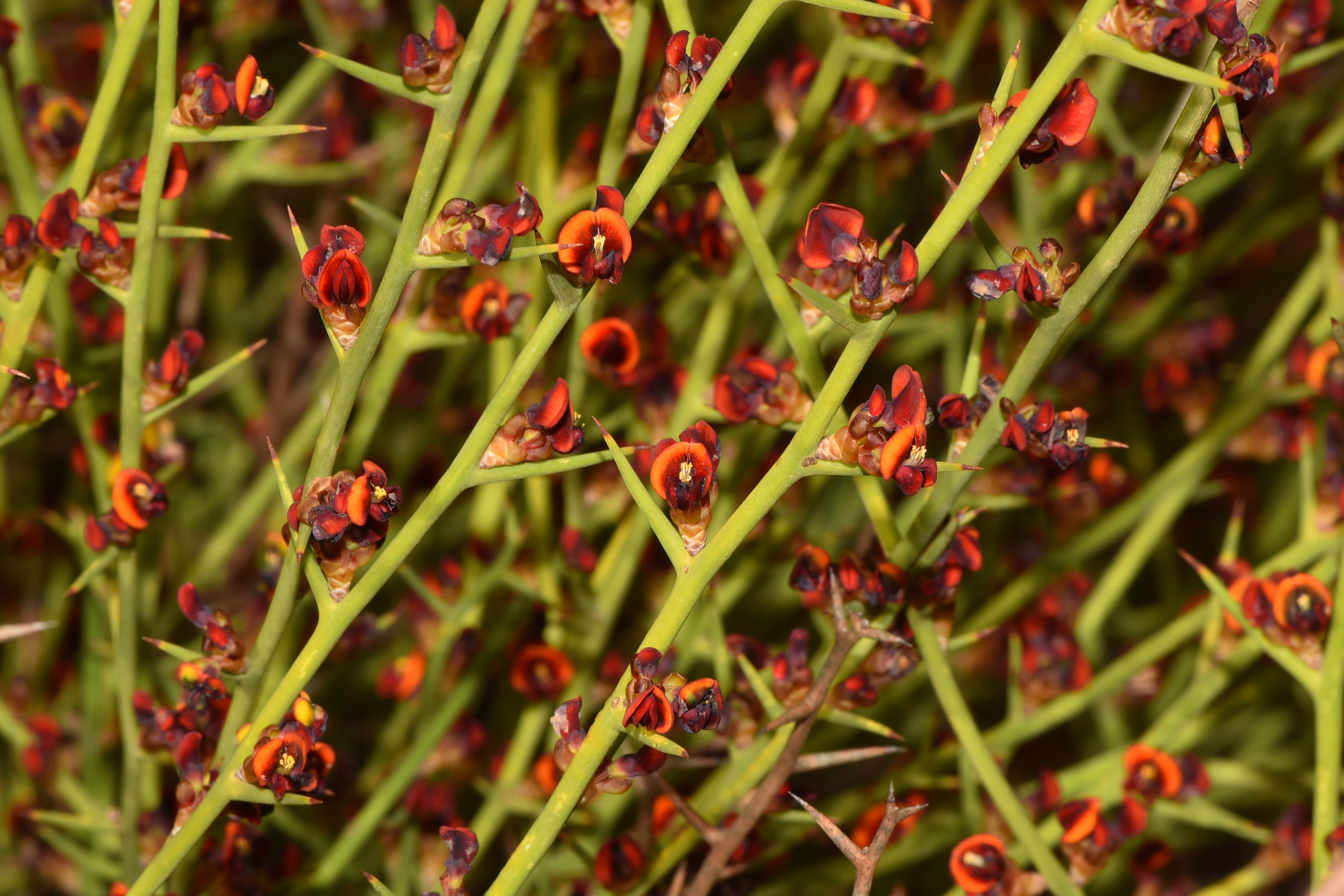

Scientific classification
- Kingdom: Plantae
- Clade: Tracheophytes
- Clade: Angiosperms
- Clade: Eudicots
- Clade: Rosids
- Order: Fabales
- Family: Fabaceae
- Subfamily: Faboideae
- Genus: Daviesia
- Species: D. hakeoides

Binomial name
- Daviesia hakeoides Meisn.

= Daviesia hakeoides =

Species of legume

Daviesia hakeoides is a species of flowering plant in the family Fabaceae and is endemic to the south-west of Western Australia. It is a shrub with many tangled stems, scattered sharply-pointed phyllodes and yellow or orange and dark red flowers.

== Description ==
Daviesia hakeoides is a glabrous shrub that typically grows to 0.3–1 m (1 ft 0 in – 3 ft 3 in) high and 0.5–2 m (1 ft 8 in – 6 ft 7 in) wide and has many tangled stems. The phyllodes are scattered, sharply-pointed and needle-shaped, up to 80 mm (3.1 in) long and 1.5 mm (0.059 in) wide at the base. The flowers are borne in groups of two to six in leaf axils on a peduncle 1.0–1.5 mm (0.039–0.059 in) long, the rachis less than 2 mm (0.079 in) long, each flower on a pedicel 1–6 mm (0.039–0.236 in) long with overlapping bracts about 1–2 mm (0.039–0.079 in) long at the base. The sepals are 2.0–2.5 mm (0.079–0.098 in) long and joined at the base, the upper two lobes more or less joined for most of their length and the lower three pointed and spread apart. The standard petal is broadly elliptic, 4.5–6 mm (0.18–0.24 in) long and yellow or orange with a dark red centre, the wings 5.0–5.5 mm (0.20–0.22 in) long and dark red, and the keel about 5 mm (0.20 in) long and dark red. Flowering mainly occurs from May to July and the fruit is an slightly inflated triangular pod 14–17 mm (0.55–0.67 in) long.

== Taxonomy ==
Daviesia hakeoides was first formally described in 1844 by English botanist Carl Meissner in Lehmann's Plantae Preissianae. The specific epithet (hakeoides) means "Hakea-like".

In 1995, Michael Crisp described two subspecies and the names are accepted by the Australian Plant Census:

- Daviesia hakeoides Meisn. subsp. hakeoides has phyllodes that are 10–80 mm (0.39–3.15 in) long;
- Daviesia hakeoides subsp. subnuda (Benth.) Crisp has phyllodes that are less than 10 mm (0.39 in) long and often absent or present as only sharp spines.

== Distribution and habitat ==
This hakea grows in open forest and woodland from Kalbarri to near Albany and inland to the wheatbelt. Subspecies seminuda grows in drier places further inland than the autonym, more often in kwongan from Yuna to Mount Barker and the wheatbelt.

== Conservation status ==
Both subspecies of D. hakeoides are listed as "not threatened" by the Department of Biodiversity, Conservation and Attractions.
