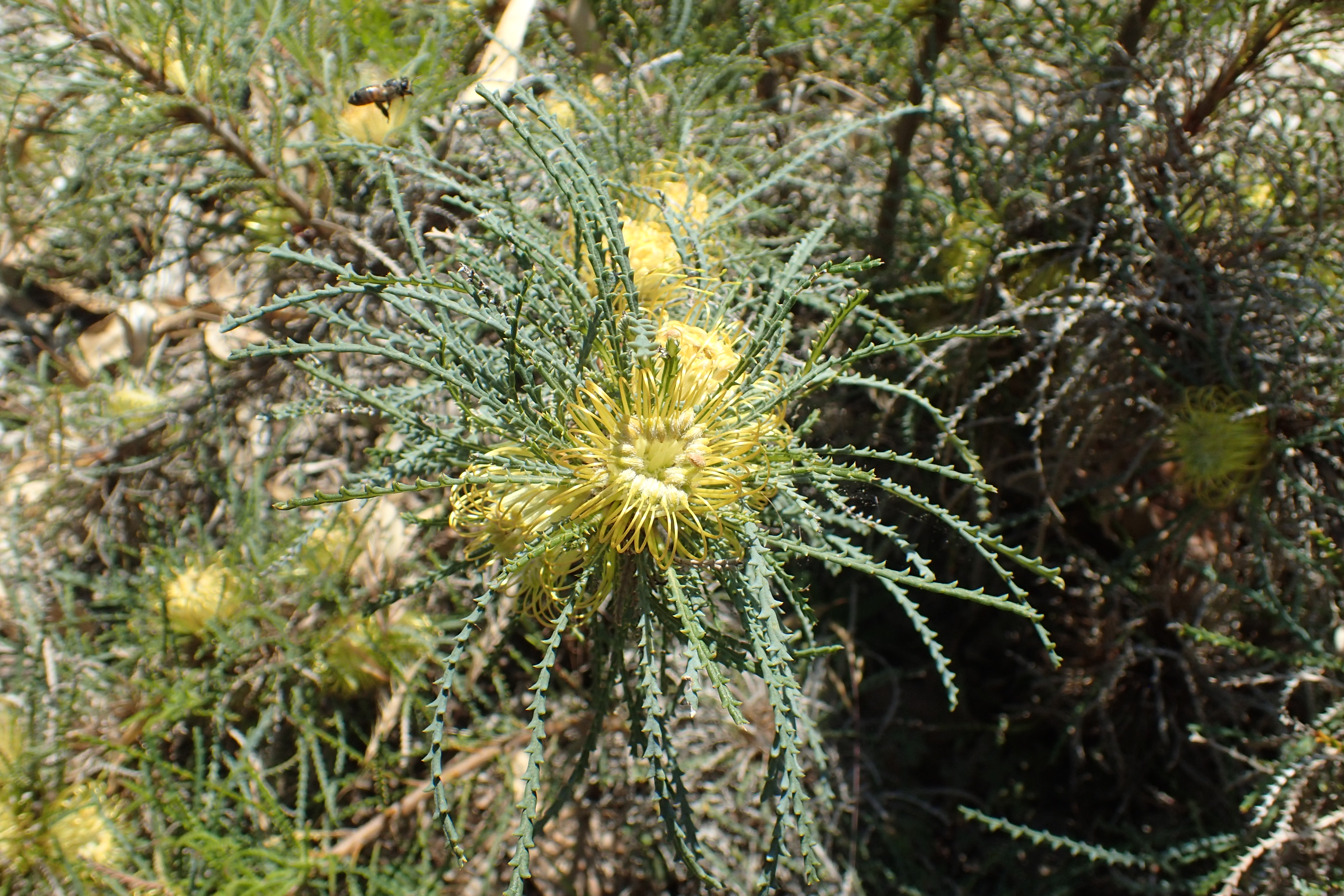
- Banksia bella in Kings Park Botanic Garden

Conservation status
- Priority Four — Rare Taxa (DEC)

Scientific classification
- Kingdom: Plantae
- Clade: Tracheophytes
- Clade: Angiosperms
- Clade: Eudicots
- Order: Proteales
- Family: Proteaceae
- Genus: Banksia
- Subgenus: Banksia subg. Banksia
- Series: Banksia ser. Dryandra
- Species: B. bella

Binomial name
- Banksia bella A.R.Mast and K.R.Thiele

Synonyms
- Dryandra pulchella Meisn.; Josephia pulchella (Meisn.) Kuntze

= Banksia bella =

Wongan dryandra

Species of shrub endemic to Western Australia

Banksia bella, commonly known as the Wongan dryandra, is a species of dense shrub that is endemic to a restricted area of Western Australia. It has narrow, deeply serrated leaves covered with white hairs on the lower surface, heads of yellow flowers and few follicles in the fruiting head.

== Description ==
Banksia bella is a dense, sprawling shrub that typically grows to a height of 1.5–2 m (4 ft 11 in – 6 ft 7 in) but does not form a lignotuber. Its stems are hairy at first but become glabrous as they age. The leaves are crowded on side branches, linear in shape, 60–200 mm (2.4–7.9 in) long, 3–4 mm (0.12–0.16 in) wide in outline, covered with white hairs on the lower surface and pinnatisect with about 35 triangular lobes about 2 mm (0.079 in) long on each side. The flowers are arranged in sessile heads of between thirty and fifty, each flower yellowish with a perianth about 24 mm (0.94 in) long. Flowering occurs in October and the fruit is a more or less spherical or broadly egg-shaped follicle 6–8 mm (0.24–0.31 in) long. There are usually only up to two follices in each head.

== Taxonomy and naming ==
The Wongan dryandra was first formally described in 1856 by Carl Meissner who gave it the name Dryandra pulchella in the journal Prodromus Systematis Naturalis Regni Vegetabilis. In 2007 Austin Mast and Kevin Thiele transferred all the dryandras to the genus Banksia but as there was already a plant named Banksia pulchella (teasel banksia), Mast and Thiele chose the specific epithet "bella". Pulchella is from a Latin word meaning "beautiful little" and bella is from a Latin word meaning "beautiful".

== Distribution and habitat ==
The Wongan dryandra is only found near Wongan Hills where it grows in tall shrubland and low woodland.
