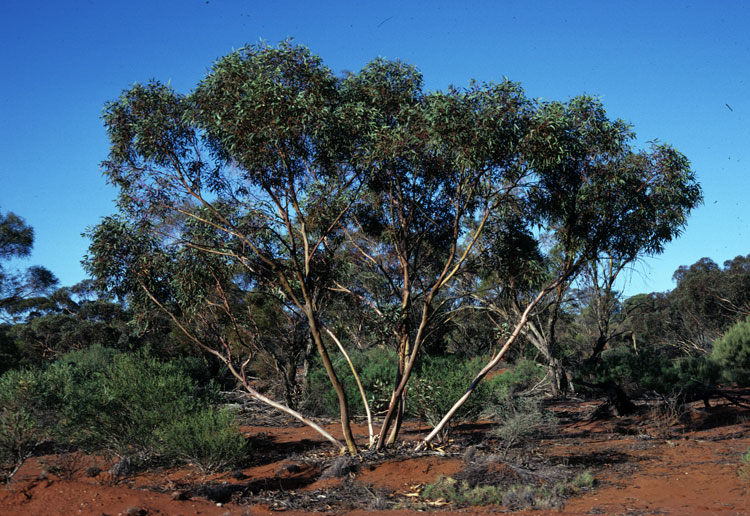
- Eucalyptus ebbanoensis near Kalgoorlie

Scientific classification
- Kingdom: Plantae
- Clade: Embryophytes
- Clade: Tracheophytes
- Clade: Spermatophytes
- Clade: Angiosperms
- Clade: Eudicots
- Clade: Rosids
- Order: Myrtales
- Family: Myrtaceae
- Genus: Eucalyptus
- Species: E. ebbanoensis

Binomial name
- Eucalyptus ebbanoensis Maiden

= Eucalyptus ebbanoensis =

Sandplain mallee

Species of eucalyptus

Eucalyptus ebbanoensis, commonly known as the sandplain mallee, is a species of mallee that is endemic to Western Australia. It has smooth greyish bark, lance-shaped to curved adult leaves, flower buds in groups of three, whitish flowers and cup-shaped to hemispherical fruit.

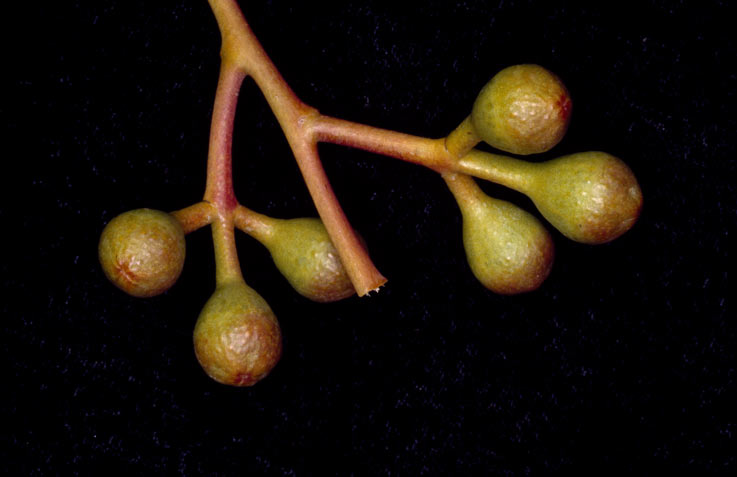
Flower buds

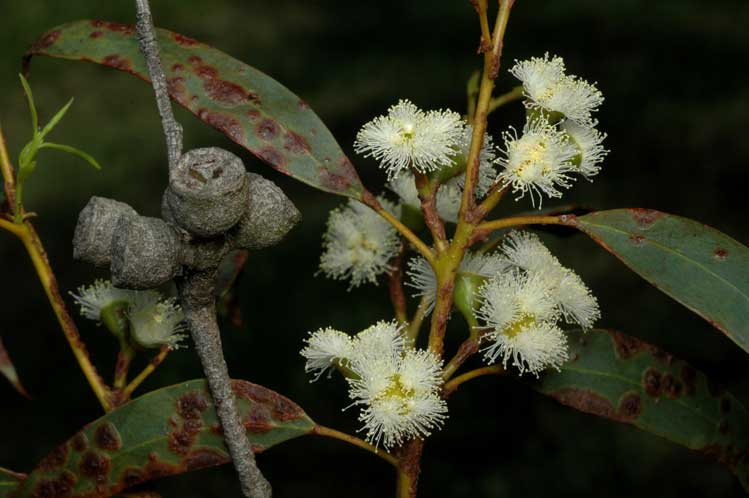
Flowers and fruit

== Description ==
Eucalyptus ebbanoensis is a mallee that typically grows to a height of 6 m (20 ft), occasionally a tree up to 10 m (33 ft), and forms a lignotuber. Young plants and coppice regrowth have hairy stems and leaves that are petiolate, 45–80 mm (1.8–3.1 in) long and 20–40 mm (0.79–1.57 in) wide. Adult leaves are lance-shaped to curved, 55–125 mm (2.2–4.9 in) long and 7–22 mm (0.28–0.87 in) wide on a petiole 8–20 mm (0.31–0.79 in) long. The flower buds are arranged in groups of three in leaf axils on a peduncle 4–10 mm (0.16–0.39 in) long, the individual buds on a pedicel 1–5 mm (0.039–0.197 in) long. Mature buds are oval to pear-shaped, 4–7 mm (0.16–0.28 in) long and 5–7 mm (0.20–0.28 in) wide with a conical or rounded operculum. Flowering mainly occurs from September to December and the flowers are creamy white. The fruit is a woody cup-shaped to hemispherical or bell-shaped capsule 6–11 mm (0.24–0.43 in) long and 8–12 mm (0.31–0.47 in) wide with the valves near the level of the rim.

== Taxonomy and naming ==
Eucalyptus ebbanoensis was first formally described in 1921 by Joseph Maiden from a specimen collected by Alexander Morrison at Ebano Springs near Mingenew in 1904. The description was published in Maiden's book A Critical Revision of the Genus Eucalyptus. The specific epithet (ebbanoensis) is a reference to the type location, although a misspelling of "Ebano Springs". The ending -ensis is a Latin suffix "denoting place, locality [or] country".

Three subspecies have been described and their names accepted by the Australian Plant Census:

- Eucalyptus ebbanoensis Maiden subsp. ebbanoensis has dull leaves lacking glaucescence;
- Eucalyptus ebbanoensis subsp. glauciramula L.A.S.Johnson & K.D.Hill has glaucous leaves;
- Eucalyptus ebbanoensis subsp. photina Brooker & Hopper has glossy leaves.

== Distribution and habitat ==
Sandplain mallee has been found in various places among breakaways, on sand plains and granite hills, growing in sandy soils and those derived from laterite. The most widespread subspecies is ebbanoensis which is found through parts of the northern Wheatbelt and Goldfields-Esperance regions to the western edge of the Great Victoria Desert. Subspecies glauciramula is found to the east of this area and subspecies photina has a restricted distribution in the Moresby Range north and east of Geraldton. These are areas of predominantly winter rainfall with an annual average of 250–400 mm (9.8–15.7 in).

== Conservation status ==
Eucalyptus ebbanoensis and the subspecies ebbanoensis and glauciramula are classified as "not threatened" by the Western Australian Government Department of Parks and Wildlife but subspecies photina is classified as "Priority Four", meaning that it is rare or near threatened.
