= Acacia tetanophylla =

Scientific classification
- Kingdom: Plantae
- Clade: Tracheophytes
- Clade: Angiosperms
- Clade: Eudicots
- Clade: Rosids
- Order: Fabales
- Family: Fabaceae
- Subfamily: Caesalpinioideae
- Clade: Mimosoid clade
- Genus: Acacia
- Species: A. tetanophylla

Binomial name
- Acacia tetanophylla Maslin
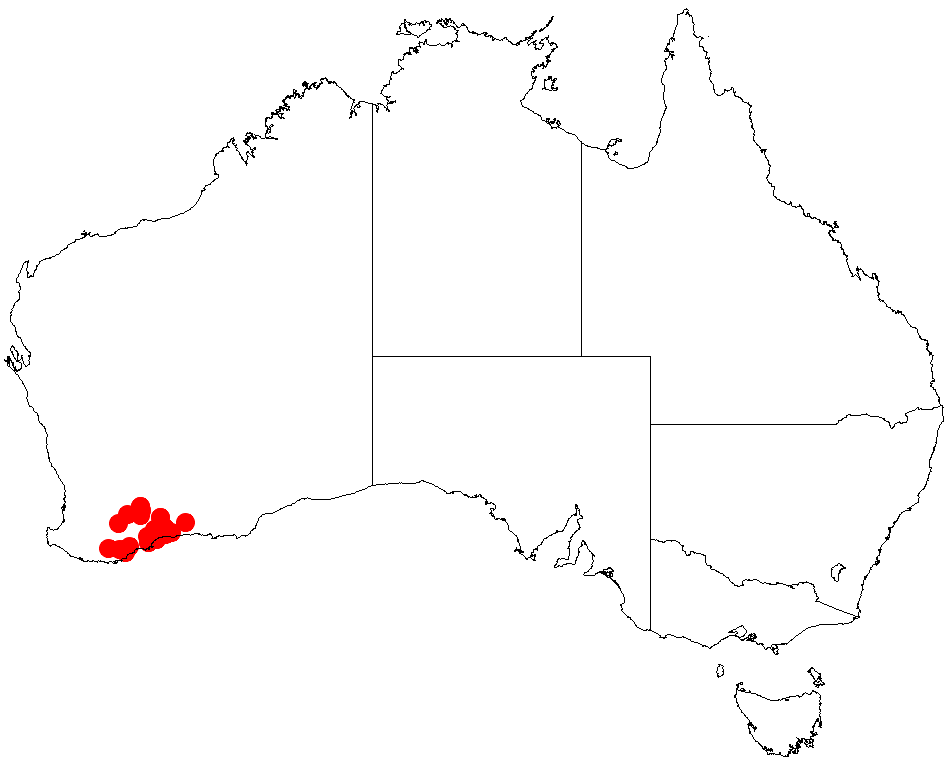
- Occurrence data from AVH

Species of legume

Acacia tetanophylla is a shrub of the genus Acacia and the subgenus Plurinerves that is endemic to an area of south western Australia.

== Description ==
The pungent shrub typically grows to a height of 0.6 to 2 metres (2 to 7 ft) with hairy to glabrous branchlets. Like most species of Acacia it has phyllodes rather than true leaves. The ascending to erect, rigid and grey-green phyllodes are usually straight and threadlike with a hexagonal cross-section when young. The glabrous phyllodes have a length of 15 to 40 mm (0.59 to 1.57 in) and a width of 1 to 1.5 mm (0.039 to 0.059 in)with a total of seven visible nerves. It blooms from August to October and produces yellow flowers. The simple inflorescences are composed of spherical flower-heads with a diameter of 3.5 to 4 mm (0.14 to 0.16 in) containing 13 to 18 usually golden coloured flowers. The firmly papery and glabrous seed pods that form after flowering usually have a linear to narrowly oblong shape with a length up to 4 cm (1.6 in) and a width of 2 to 4 mm (0.079 to 0.157 in). the pods contain shiny dark brown to black coloured seeds with an oblong-elliptic to ovate shape thar are 2.5 to 3 mm (0.098 to 0.118 in) in length.

== Taxonomy ==
The species was first formally described by the botanist Bruce Maslin in 1977 as a part of the work Studies in the genus Acacia (Mimosaceae) - Miscellany as published in the journal Nuytsia. It was reclassified by Leslie Pedley in 2003 as Racosperma tetanophyllum then transferred back to genus Acacia in 2006.

== Distribution ==
It is native to an area in the Great Southern, Goldfields-Esperance and Wheatbelt regions of Western Australia where it is commonly situated on plains along creeks and rivers growing in rock or sandy loams or sandy-clay or sandy soils often over or around granite. The range extends from just south of the Stirling Range in the north-west out to around Ravensthorpe in the south east with outliers near Nyabing and Lake King both of which are further north.

== See also ==
- List of Acacia species
