= Acacia subcaerulea =

Scientific classification
- Kingdom: Plantae
- Clade: Tracheophytes
- Clade: Angiosperms
- Clade: Eudicots
- Clade: Rosids
- Order: Fabales
- Family: Fabaceae
- Subfamily: Caesalpinioideae
- Clade: Mimosoid clade
- Genus: Acacia
- Species: A. subcaerulea

Binomial name
- Acacia subcaerulea Lindl.
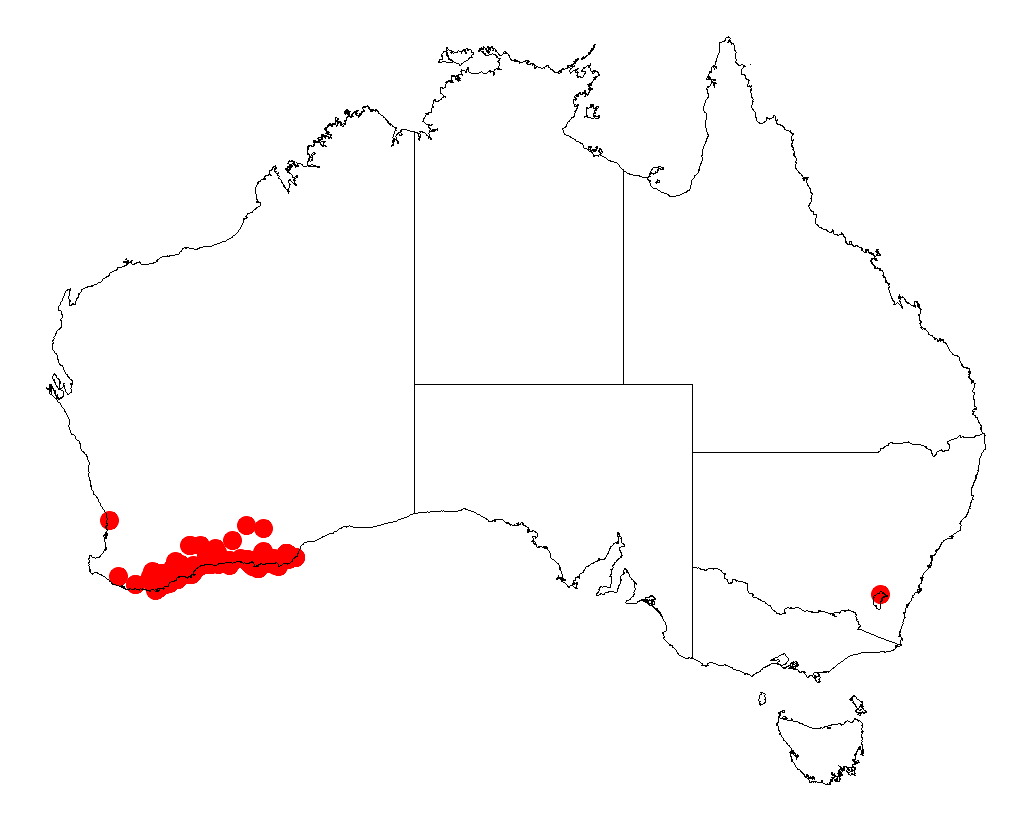
- Occurrence data from AVH

Species of legume

Acacia subcaerulea is a shrub of the genus Acacia and the subgenus Phyllodineae. It is native to coastal areas in the Goldfields-Esperance, Great Southern and South West regions of Western Australia.

== Description ==
The slender shrub typically grows to a height of 1 to 3 metres (3 to 10 ft). It blooms from March to September and produces yellow flowers.

== See also ==
- List of Acacia species
