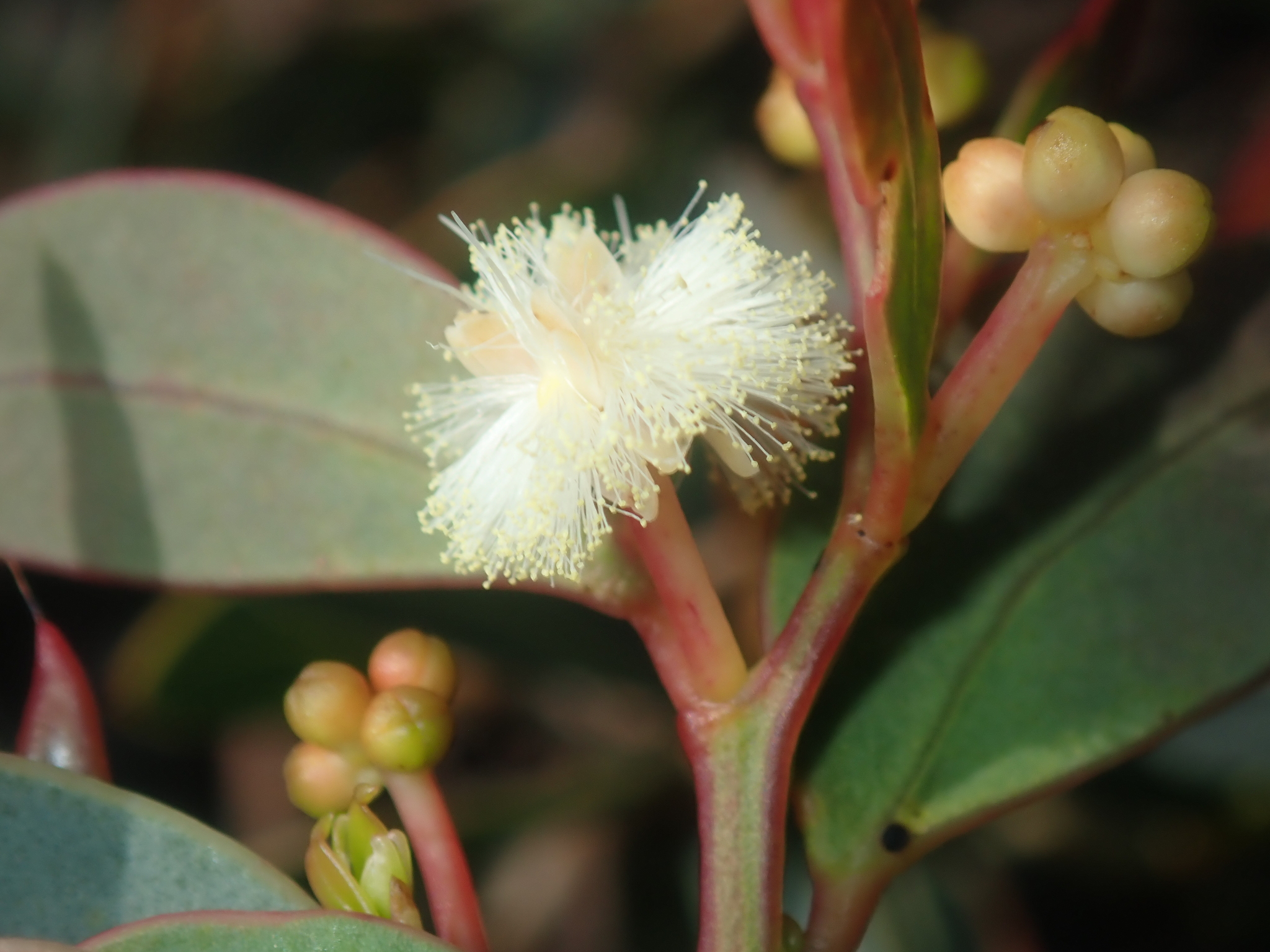
- In Lesueur National Park

Scientific classification
- Kingdom: Plantae
- Clade: Tracheophytes
- Clade: Angiosperms
- Clade: Eudicots
- Clade: Rosids
- Order: Fabales
- Family: Fabaceae
- Subfamily: Caesalpinioideae
- Clade: Mimosoid clade
- Genus: Acacia
- Subgenus: Acacia subg. Phyllodineae
- Species: A. clydonophora

Binomial name
- Acacia clydonophora Maslin
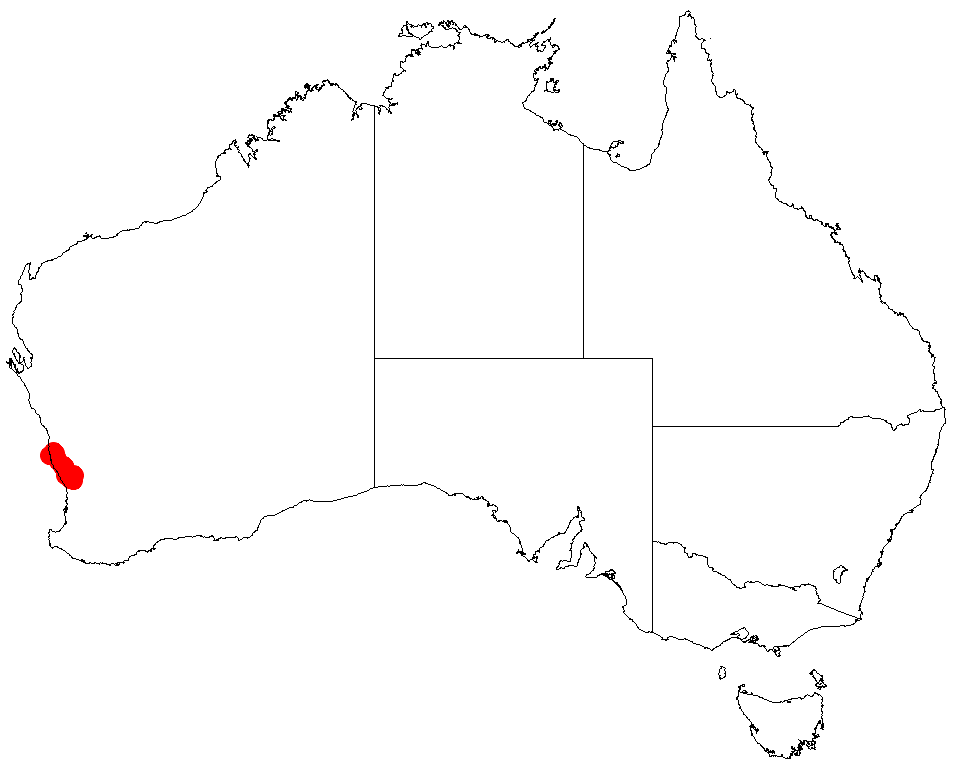
- Occurrence data from AVH

Synonyms
- ? Acacia aff. myrtifolia [P33] (R.J.Cranfield 33); Racosperma clydonophorum (Maslin) Pedley

= Acacia clydonophora =

Species of shrub

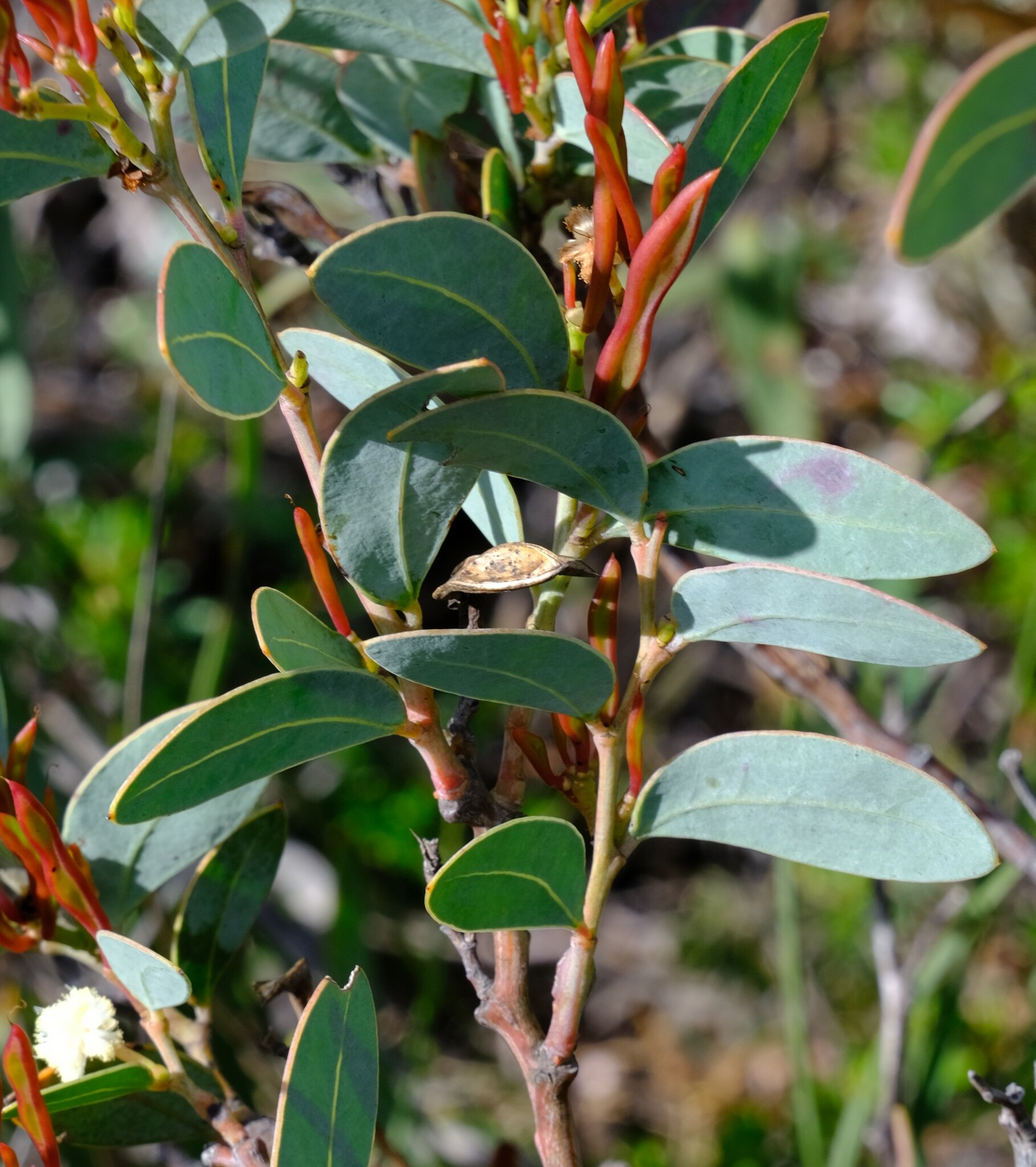
Foliage

Acacia clydonophora is a species of flowering plant in the family Fabaceae and is endemic to the south-west of Western Australia. It is a glabrous, open shrub with striated branchlets, elliptic to narrowly elliptic phyllodes, spherical heads of cream-coloured to creamy yellow flowers, and erect, linear, curved pods.

== Description ==
Acacia clydonophora is a glabrous, open shrub that typically grows to a height of 0.7–1.5 m (2 ft 4 in – 4 ft 11 in) with prominently striated branchlets. Its phyllodes are elliptic to narrowly elliptic, sometimes tending to egg-shaped or lance-shaped, sometimes with the narrower end towards the base, 40–120 mm (1.6–4.7 in) long and 15–40 mm (0.59–1.57 in) wide with a prominent midrib and marginal veins. The flowers are borne in spherical heads in 3 to 14 racemes 5–30 mm (0.20–1.18 in) long on peduncles 5–7 mm (0.20–0.28 in) long, each head with 5 to 7 loosely arranged, cream-coloured to creamy yellow flowers. Flowering occurs from April to November and the pods are erect, linear to curved, crust-like to more or less woody, about 70 mm (2.8 in) long and 4–5 mm (0.16–0.20 in) wide. The seeds are shiny, dark brown, and narrowly oblong, 5–6 mm (0.20–0.24 in) long with an aril on the end.

== Taxonomy ==
Acacia clydonophora was first formally described in 1995 by Bruce Maslin from specimens collected in 1974 by Alex George, on the summit of Mount Lesueur. The specific epithet (clydonophora) means 'wave-bearing', referring to the edges of the pods.

== Distribution ==
This species of wattle is native to near-coastal areas of Western Australia between Dandaragan and Chittering where it grows on lateritic ridges and breakaways in sandy or loam over lateritic gravel in the Geraldton Sandplains and Swan Coastal Plain bioregions of south-western Western Australia.

== See also ==
- List of Acacia species
