= Acacia disticha =

Scientific classification
- Kingdom: Plantae
- Clade: Tracheophytes
- Clade: Angiosperms
- Clade: Eudicots
- Clade: Rosids
- Order: Fabales
- Family: Fabaceae
- Subfamily: Caesalpinioideae
- Clade: Mimosoid clade
- Genus: Acacia
- Species: A. disticha

Binomial name
- Acacia disticha Maslin
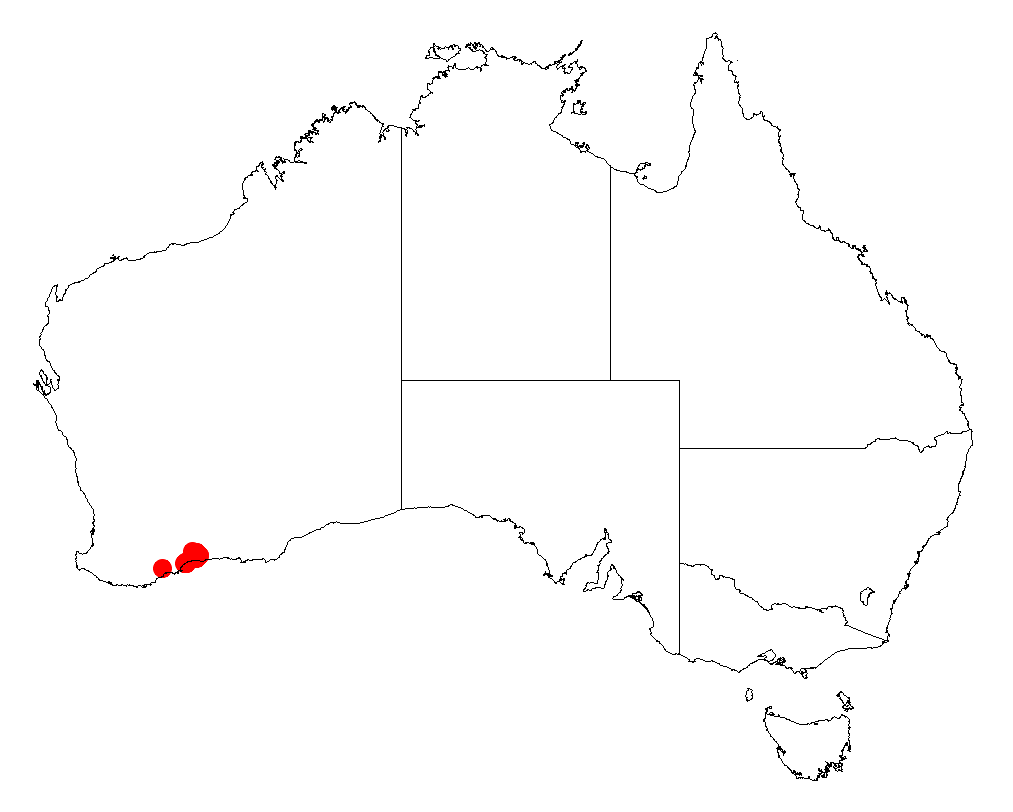
- Occurrence data from AVH

Synonyms
- Acacia aff. myrtifolia [P34] (A.S.George 10588); Racosperma distichum (Maslin) Pedley

Species of legume

Acacia disticha is a species of flowering plant in the family Fabaceae and is endemic to the south-west of Western Australia. It is a glabrous, spreading shrub with phyllodes arranged in vertical rows on opposite sides of the ends of flattened branchlets, spherical heads of cream-coloured flowers and narrowly oblong, crusty to woody pods.

== Description ==
Acacia disticha is a glabrous spreading shrub that grows to a height of up to about 1 m (3 ft 3 in) high and 2 m (6 ft 7 in) wide in sheltered situations. Its branchlets are roughened by raised leaf bases where phyllodes have fallen. The phyllodes are elliptic and arranged in vertical rows on opposite sides of the ends of flattened branchlets, variable in size, 15–43 mm (0.59–1.69 in) long and 4–22 mm (0.16–0.87 in) wide with a gland 2–5 mm (0.079–0.197 in) above the base of the phyllode. The flowers are arranged in two spherical heads in axils on peduncles 7–11 mm (0.28–0.43 in) long, each head with six or seven loosely arranged, cream-coloured flowers. Flowering occurs from September to February, and the pods are narrowly oblong, crusty to more or less woody, up to 40 mm (1.6 in) long and 5.0–5.5 mm (0.20–0.22 in) long on a strongly curved stalk. The seeds are oblong, about 4 mm (0.16 in) long and slightly shiny brown with an aril on the end.

== Taxonomy ==
Acacia disticha was first formally described in 1995 by Bruce Maslin in the journal Nuytsia, from specimens collected by Alex George on the northern end of Middle Mount Barren in 1970. The specific epithet (disticha) means 'in two rows or lines', referring to the arrangement of the phyllodes.

== Distribution and habitat ==
This species of wattle grows on sand, rocky loam and limestone soils amongst rocks and along watercourses in tall shrubland or closed scrub where it dominates he low scrub layer. It is an uncommon species, mostly confined to the Fitzgerald River National Park, but also in the Corackerup Nature Reserve 100 km (62 mi) to the west-south-west and the Ravensthorpe Range abpout 40 km (25 mi) to the north east, in the Esperance Plains bioregion of south-western Western Australia.

== Conservation status ==
Acacia disticha is listed as "not threatened" by the Government of Western Australia Department of Biodiversity, Conservation and Attractions.

== See also ==
- List of Acacia species
