= Acacia obovata =

- Near Keysbrook

Scientific classification
- Kingdom: Plantae
- Clade: Tracheophytes
- Clade: Angiosperms
- Clade: Eudicots
- Clade: Rosids
- Order: Fabales
- Family: Fabaceae
- Subfamily: Caesalpinioideae
- Clade: Mimosoid clade
- Genus: Acacia
- Species: A. obovata

Binomial name
- Acacia obovata Benth.
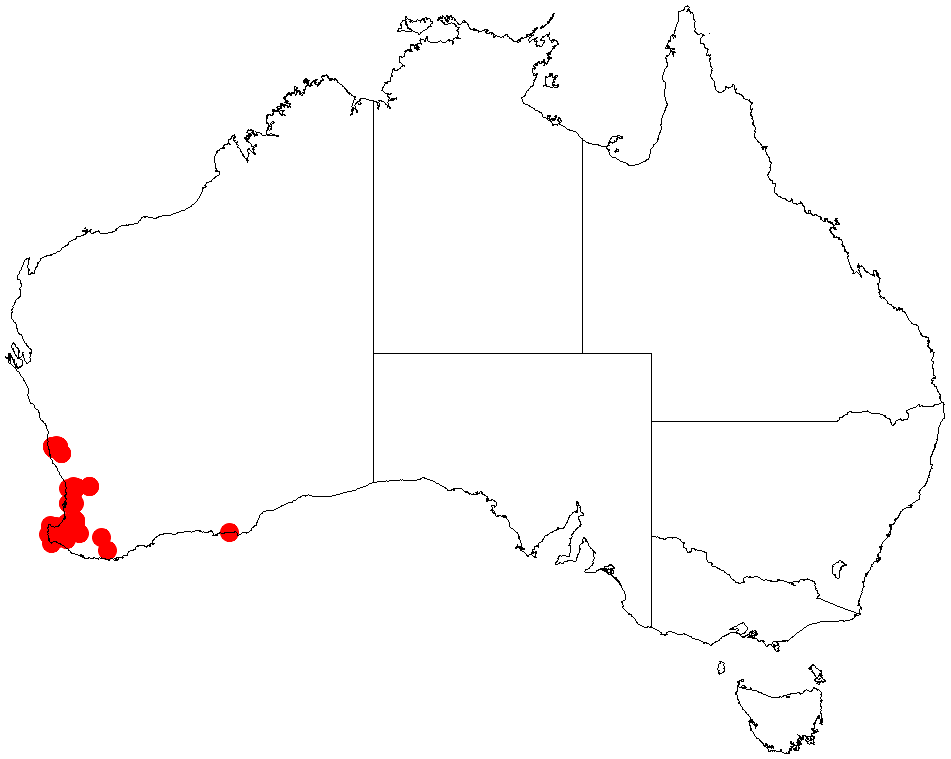
- Occurrence data from AVH

Synonyms
- Acacia obovata var. minor Meisn.; Acacia obovata Benth. var. obovata; Racosperma obovatum (Benth.) Pedley

Species of legume

Acacia obovata is a species of flowering plant in the family Fabaceae, and is endemic to the south-west of Western Australia. It is an erect shrub with slender stems, hairy branchlets, elliptic to broadly elliptic, wavy phyllodes, spherical heads of pale yellow to white flowers and linear, glabrous, leathery to crusty pods.

== Description ==
Acacia obovata is an erect shrub with many slender stems that typically grows to a height of 30–60 cm (12–24 in) with a woody rootstock and usually hairy branchlets. Its phyllodes are elliptic to broadly elliptic, or egg-shaped with the narrower end towards the base, 15–50 mm (0.59–1.97 in) long, 10–25 mm (0.39–0.98 in) wide, wavy and sometimes sharply pointed. There are narrowly triangular stipules at the base of the phyllodes, the midrib and marginal veins are prominent, and there is a slightly raised gland 3–11 mm (0.12–0.43 in) above the base. The flowers are borne in a spherical head in axils on a peduncle 10–20 mm (0.39–0.79 in) long, each head with 5 to 9 loosely arranged pale white to yellow flowers. Flowering occurs from March to September, and the pods are linear, spirally twisted, at least when young, up to 110 mm (4.3 in) long, 5–6 mm (0.20–0.24 in) wide, glabrous and leathery to crusty or subwoody with thick margins. The seeds are oblong, about 4 mm (0.16 in) wide, glossy dark brown with an aril on the end.

== Taxonomy ==
Acacia obovata was first formally described in 1842 by George Bentham in Hooker's London Journal of Botany. The specific epithet (obovata) means 'inverted egg-shaped'.

== Distribution and habitat ==
This species of wattle grows in jarrah (Eucalyptus marginata) - marri (Corymbia calophylla) forest or in low open heath in scattered places from east of Jurien Bay, in the Gairdner Range, the Darling Range east of Perth, south to near Collie, in the Whicher Range, west to Yallingup and south to near Augusta, in the Avon Wheatbelt, Geraldton Sandplains, Jarrah Forest, Swan Coastal Plain and Warren bioregions of south-western Western Australia.

== See also ==
- List of Acacia species
