= Philotheca wonganensis =

Wongan philotheca

Conservation status
- Endangered (EPBC Act)

Scientific classification
- Kingdom: Plantae
- Clade: Embryophytes
- Clade: Tracheophytes
- Clade: Spermatophytes
- Clade: Angiosperms
- Clade: Eudicots
- Clade: Rosids
- Order: Sapindales
- Family: Rutaceae
- Genus: Philotheca
- Species: P. wonganensis

Binomial name
- Philotheca wonganensis (Paul G.Wilson) Paul G.Wilson

Synonyms
- Eriostemon wonganensis Paul G.Wilson

Species of plant

Philotheca wonganensis, commonly known as Wongan philotheca, is a species of flowering plant in the family Rutaceae and is endemic to the south-west of Western Australia. It is a shrub with thin, cylindrical leaves and white flowers with a pink central stripe, usually arranged singly in leaf axils.

== Description ==
Philotheca wonganensis is a shrub that typically grows to a height of 1 m (3 ft 3 in) with corky branchlets. The leaves are thin, scattered, needle-shaped, 5–10 mm (0.20–0.39 in), sometimes glandular-warty, and channelled on the upper surface. The flowers are arranged singly in leaf axils on a thin, club-shaped pedicel about 5 mm (0.20 in) long. There are five broadly egg-shaped sepals about 1 mm (0.039 in) long and five white, oblong to elliptical petals about 5 mm (0.20 in) long with a pink central stripe. The ten stamens are free from each other and form a pyramid above the ovary. Flowering occurs from August to October and the fruit is about 3 mm (0.12 in) long with a short beak.

== Taxonomy and naming ==
This philotheca was first formally described in 1982 by Paul Wilson who gave it the name Eriostemon wonganensis and published the description in the journal Nuytsia from specimens collected by Kevin Kenneally near Wongan Hills township in 1980. In 1998, Wilson changed the name to Philotheca wonganensis in the same journal.

== Distribution and habitat ==
Philotheca wonganensis grows in dense shrubland and woodland with a shrubby understorey. It is only known from four populations in the Shire of Wongan–Ballidu in the south-west of Western Australia.

== Conservation status ==
This philotheca is classified as "endangered" under the Australian Government Environment Protection and Biodiversity Conservation Act 1999 and as "Threatened Flora (Declared Rare Flora — Extant)" by the Department of Environment and Conservation (Western Australia). The main threat to the species is poor recruitment.
