= Avon Wheatbelt =

Bioregion in Western Australia

- Region
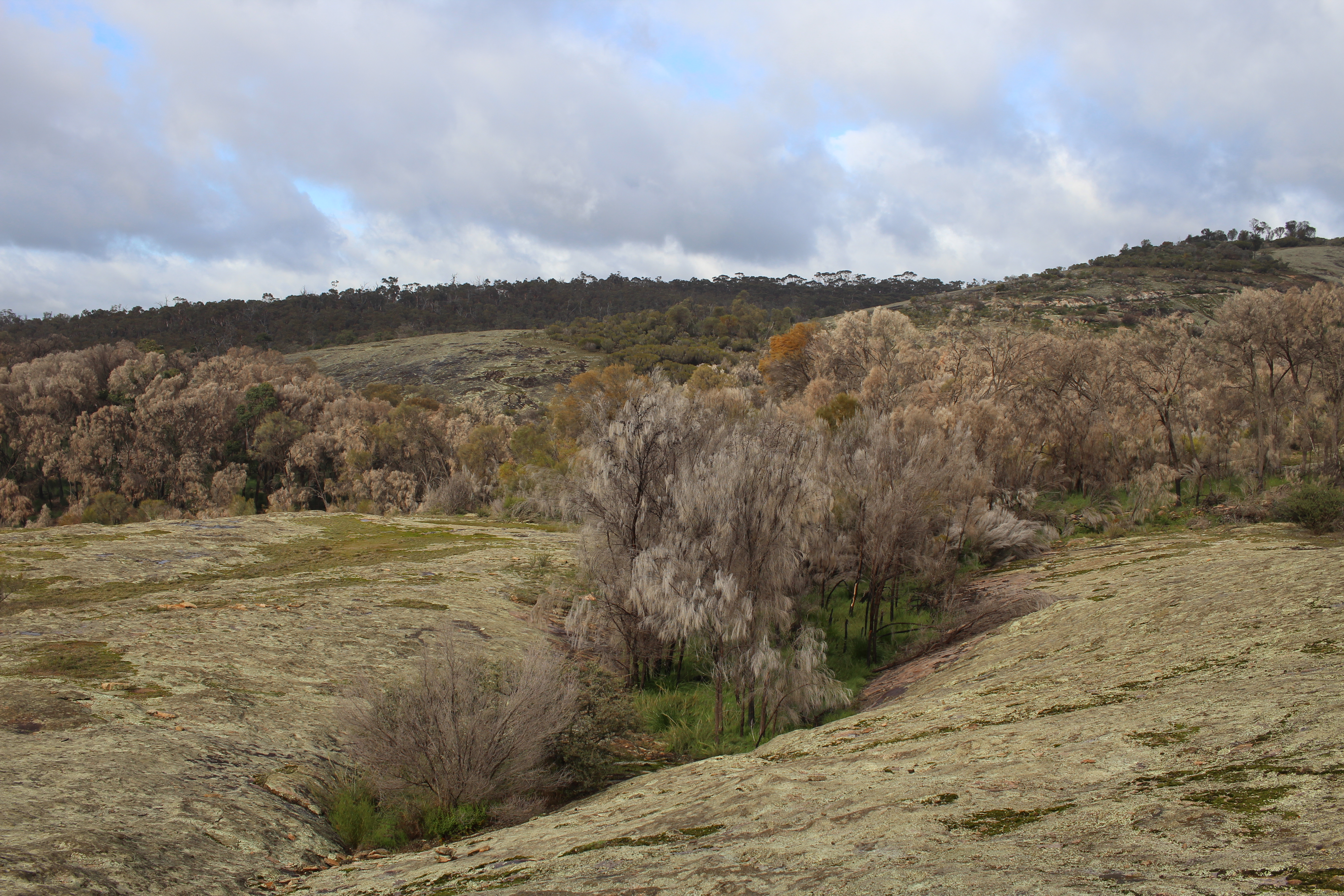
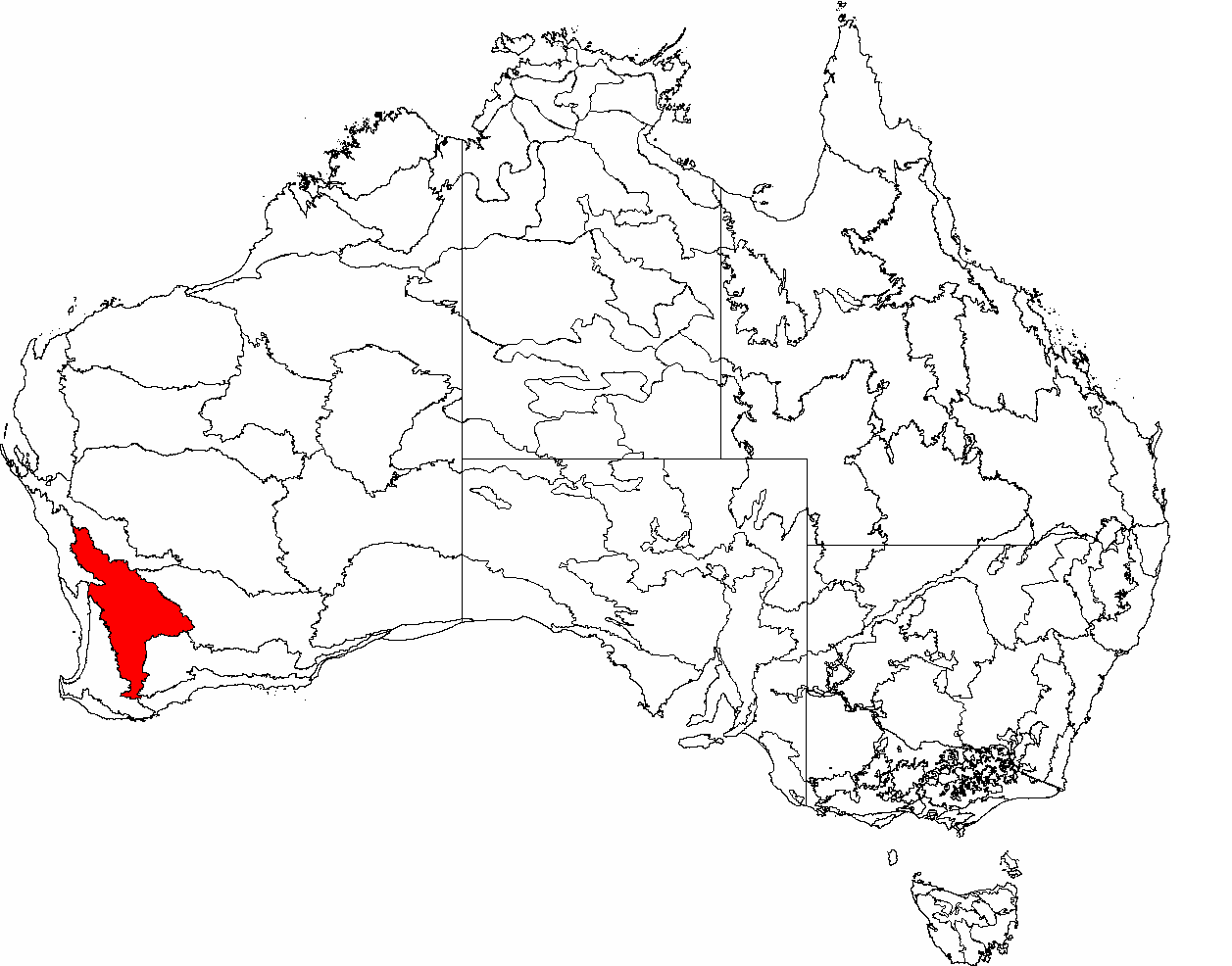
- Boyagin Nature Reserve The interim Australian bioregions, with Avon Wheatbelt in red
- Country: Australia
- State: Western Australia

Area
  - Total: 95,171.04 km^{2} (36,745.74 sq mi)
Localities around Avon Wheatbelt
Geraldton Sandplains	Yalgoo	Yalgoo
Swan Coastal Plain	Avon Wheatbelt	Coolgardie
Jarrah Forest	Jarrah Forest	Mallee

The Avon Wheatbelt is a bioregion in Western Australia. It has an area of 9,517,104 hectares (23,517,280 acres). It is considered part of the larger Southwest Australia savanna ecoregion.

== Geography ==
The Avon Wheatbelt bioregion is mostly a gently undulating landscape with low relief. It lies on the Yilgarn craton, an ancient block of crystalline rock, which was uplifted in the Tertiary and dissected by rivers. The craton is overlain by laterite deposits, which in places have decomposed into yellow sandplains, particularly on low hills. Steep-sided erosional gullies, known as breakaways, are common.

In the south and west (the Katanning subregion), streams are mostly perennial, and feed rivers which drain westwards to empty into the Indian Ocean. In the centre, east, and north (Merredin subregion) there is no connected drainage. Here streams, which are remnants of ancient drainage systems, flow only during wet years, and drain to chains of salt lakes.

=== Subregions ===
It has within it two subregions named after localities within the region:

- Merredin - AVW01 6,524,175 hectares (16,121,590 acres)
- Katanning - AVW02 2,992,929 hectares (7,395,690 acres)

== Climate ==
The bioregion has a semi-arid Mediterranean climate, with hot, dry summers and mild winters, with most rainfall occurring in the winter months. The Avon Wheatbelt is generally drier than the Darling Scarp to the west.

== Flora and fauna ==
Scrub-heath, characterized by shrubs in the Proteaceae family, are common on sandplains and lateritic uplands. These scrub-heaths are species-rich, and include many endemic plants. Mixed eucalypt woodlands with salmon gum (Eucalyptus salmonophloia) and rock sheoak (Allocasuarina huegeliana), and woodlands of jam (Acacia acuminata) and York gum (Eucalyptus loxophleba), are found on granite-derived soils and the alluvial soils of plains and stream valleys. There are smaller areas of wandoo woodland.

The Wongan Hills are a range of flat-topped hills, dissected by steep gullies, in the northern portion of the bioregion. They are the largest area of intact vegetation in the northern Wheatbelt. The hills are home to remnant woodlands of salmon gum, York gum, gimlet (Eucalyptus salubris), and silver mallet (Eucalyptus falcata), and low forest of jam (Acacia acuminata), plant communities were once widespread but now rare in the Wheatbelt. The hills are home to 90 species of birds. Plants endemic to the Wongan Hills include Acacia botrydion, Acacia pharangites, Acacia pygmaea, Banksia bella, Eremophila ternifolia, Philotheca wonganensis, and Chenopodium aciculare.

Granite outcrops, like Boyagin Rock, Kokerbin Rock, and Yilliminning Rock, are important as seasonal habitats and refuges for native fauna. Some are home to some endemic species, including the tree Eucalyptus caesia endemic to Boyagin Rock and the lichens Paraparmelia sammyi and Paraparmelia sargentii endemic to Yilliminning Rock. Granite pools are home to 350 species of aquatic invertebrates, including 50 thought to be endemic to the Wheatbelt.

Native mammals include the red-tailed phascogale (Phascogale calura), black-flanked rock-wallaby (Petrogale lateralis lateralis), western brush wallaby (Macropus irma), and common brushtail possum (Trichosurus vulpecula). Several other once-native mammals are now locally extinct.

Native birds include malleefowl (Leipoa ocellata), Carnaby's black cockatoo (Calyptorhynchus latirostris), Baudin's black cockatoo (Calyptorhynchus baudinii), and Australian bustard (Ardeotis australis).

Toolibin Lake is an important breeding area for waterbirds in the inland drainage systems of south-western Australia, particularly freckled duck (Stictonetta naevosa).

== Land use ==
Much of the land is used for dryland farming, particularly wheat. Extensive areas have been converted to pasture for livestock grazing.

== Protected areas ==
Less than 5% of the Avon Wheatbelt bioregion is in protected areas.
