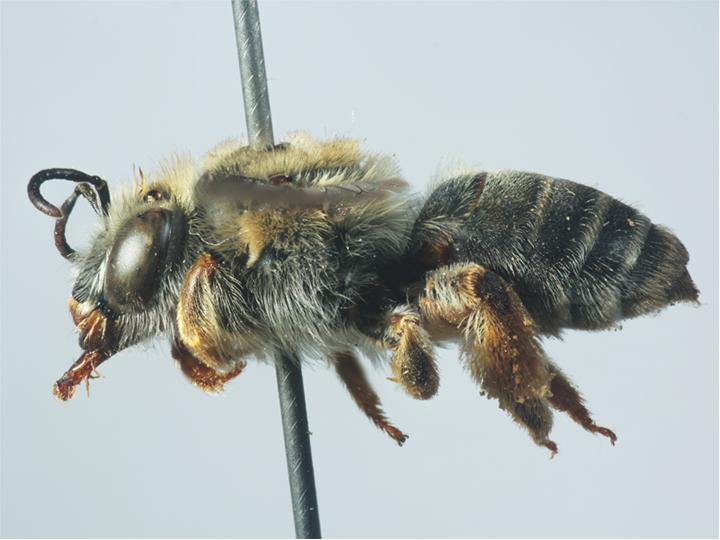
- Female

Scientific classification
- Kingdom: Animalia
- Phylum: Arthropoda
- Clade: Pancrustacea
- Class: Insecta
- Order: Hymenoptera
- Family: Colletidae
- Genus: Trichocolletes
- Species: T. orientalis

Binomial name
- Trichocolletes orientalis Batley & Houston, 2012

= Trichocolletes orientalis =

Species of bee

Trichocolletes orientalis is a species of bee in the family Colletidae and the subfamily Colletinae. It is endemic to Australia. It was described in 2012 by Australian entomologists Michael Batley and Terry Houston.

== Etymology ==
The specific epithet orientalis (Latin: 'eastern') refers to the distribution of the species.

== Description ==
The body length is about 10–12 mm. The eyes are not hairy. Colouration is mainly black and brown, with white and orange hair. The bees have silver, occasionally gold, metasomal bands.

== Distribution and habitat ==
The species occurs in eastern Australia. The type locality is Wollar in New South Wales.

== Behaviour ==
The adults are flying mellivores. Flowering plants visited by the bees include Boronia ledifolia, Dillwynia floribunda, Dillwynia retorta, Dillwynia glaberrima, Daviesia mimosoides, Daviesia genistifolia, Daviesia acicularis, Daviesia squarrosa, Daviesia ulicifolia, Hardenbergia violacea, Leucopogon biflorus, Monotoca scoparia, Pultenaea procumbens, Pultenaea villosa and Swainsona lessertiifolia.

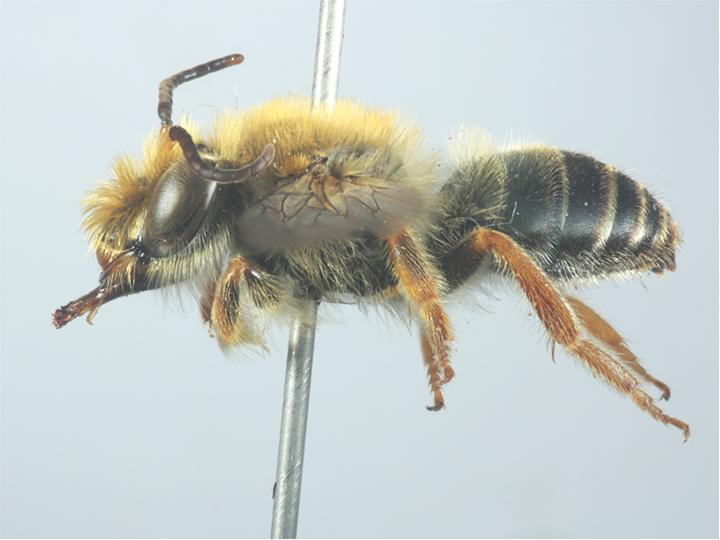
Male
