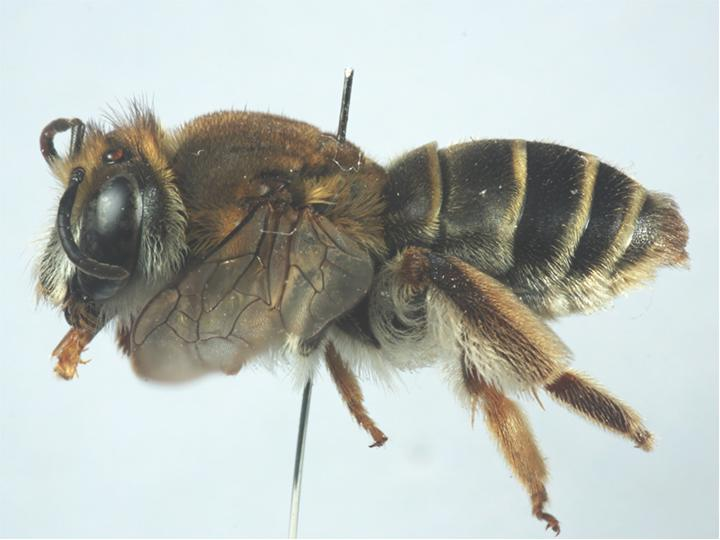
- Female

Scientific classification
- Kingdom: Animalia
- Phylum: Arthropoda
- Clade: Pancrustacea
- Class: Insecta
- Order: Hymenoptera
- Family: Colletidae
- Genus: Trichocolletes
- Species: T. serotinus

Binomial name
- Trichocolletes serotinus Batley & Houston, 2012

= Trichocolletes serotinus =

Species of bee

Trichocolletes serotinus is a species of bee in the family Colletidae and the subfamily Colletinae. It is endemic to Australia. It was described in 2012 by Australian entomologists Michael Batley and Terry Houston.

== Etymology ==
The specific epithet serotinus (Latin: 'late in coming') refers to the flight phenology of the species.

== Description ==
The body length is about 11–12 mm. The eyes are not hairy. Colouration is mainly black and brown, with pale orange to orange-brown hair. The bees have gold metasomal bands.

== Distribution and habitat ==
The species occurs in cooler areas of south-eastern Australia, including Tasmania. The type locality is Mount Hay Road, New South Wales.

== Behaviour ==
The adults are flying mellivores that are active in late spring and summer. Flowering plants visited by the bees include Boronia microphylla, Daviesia alata, Daviesia corymbosa, Daviesia mimosoides, Dillwynia floribunda, Mirbelia platylobioides, Mirbelia oxylobioides and Pultenaea setulosa, as well as Leucopogon and Platylobium species.

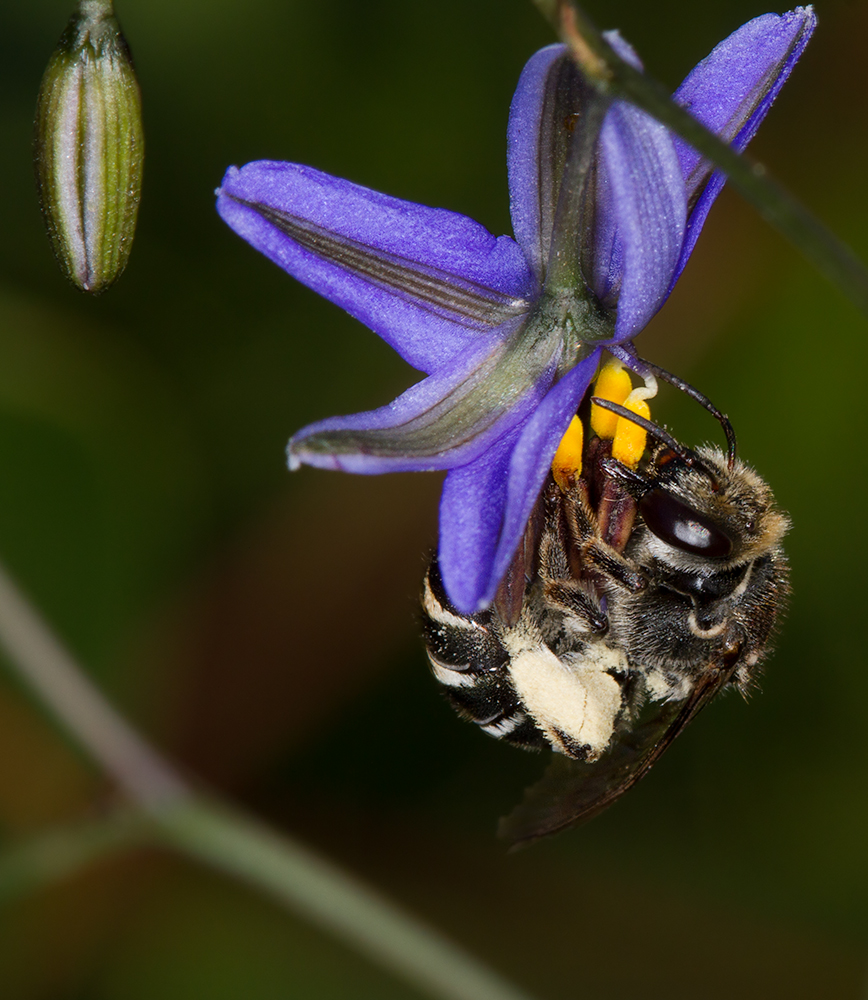
Trichocolletes serotinus on Black-anther Flax-lily Dianella revoluta

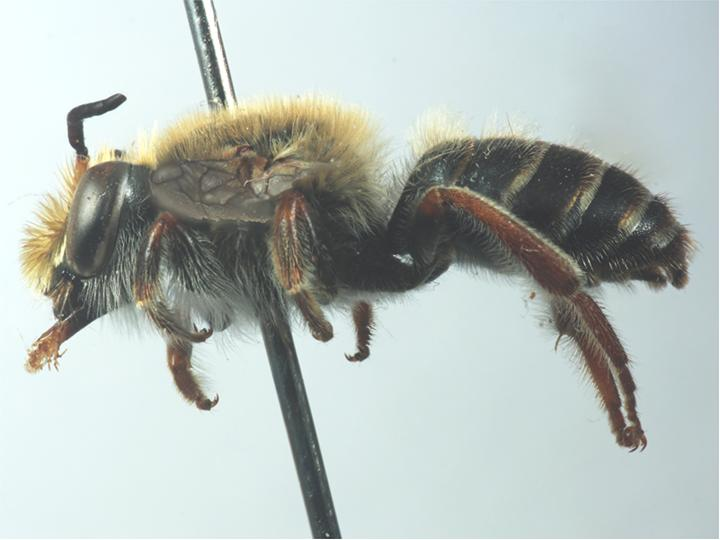
Male
