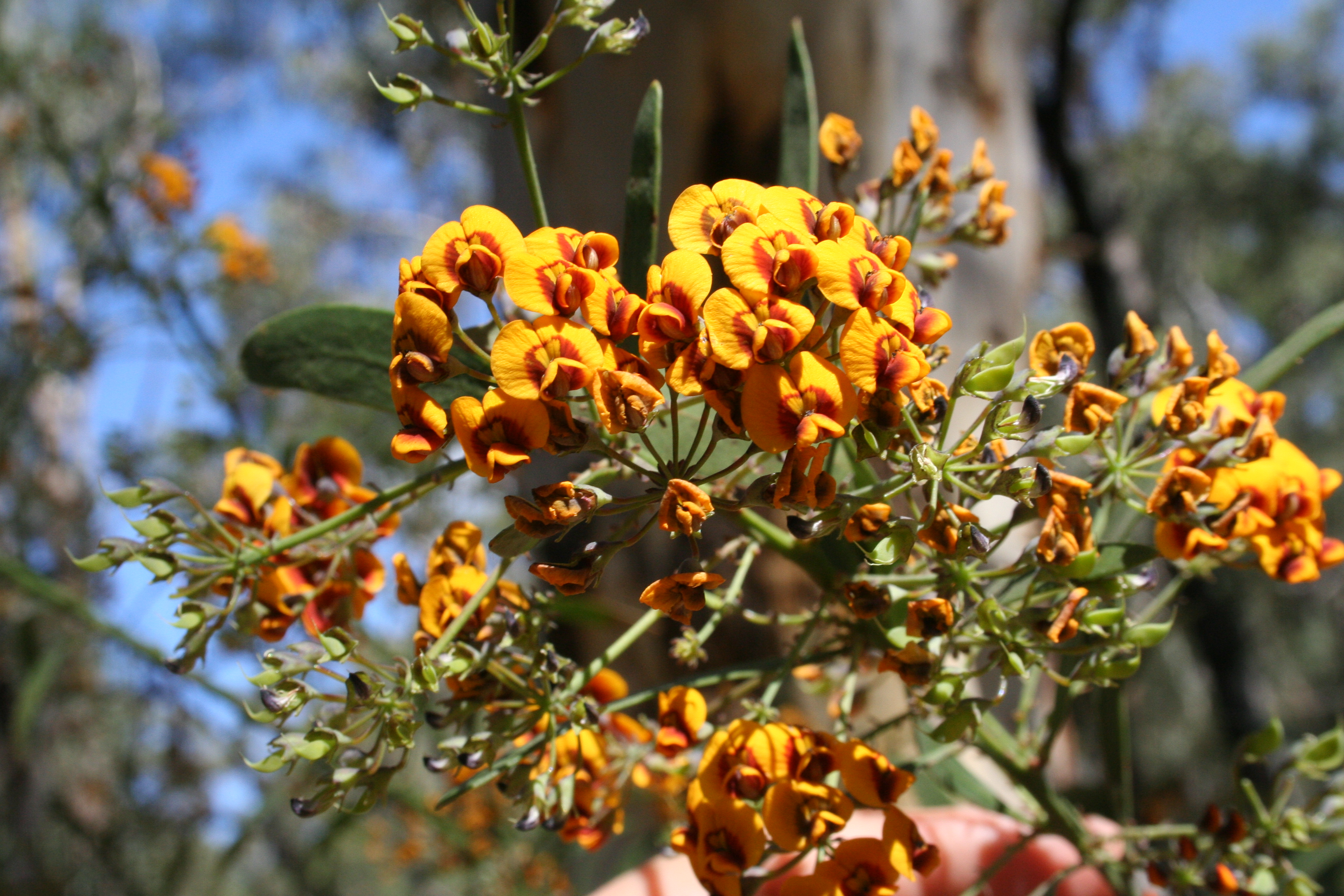

Scientific classification
- Kingdom: Plantae
- Clade: Tracheophytes
- Clade: Angiosperms
- Clade: Eudicots
- Clade: Rosids
- Order: Fabales
- Family: Fabaceae
- Subfamily: Faboideae
- Genus: Daviesia
- Species: D. corymbosa

Binomial name
- Daviesia corymbosa Sm.

Synonyms
- Daviesia macrophylla Endl.

= Daviesia corymbosa =

Species of legume

Daviesia corymbosa, also known as narrow leaf bitter pea, is a species of flowering plant in the family Fabaceae native to the state of New South Wales in eastern Australia. A shrub to 2 m (6.6 ft) high, it grows in sandstone soils in open eucalyptus woodland or heath. It produces showy flowerheads of red and yellow flowers in the spring and early summer.

== Taxonomy ==
English botanist James Edward Smith formally described the species in 1805, which it still bears its original name, and chose the genus named to honour Welsh botanist Hugh Davies. The specific epithet is named for corymb, or the arrangement of the flowers. Daviesia corymbosa is most closely related to D. latifolia, D. laevis and D. laxiflora. Hybrids with D. latifolia and D. ulicifolia have been reported.

== Description ==
Daviesia corymbosa grows as an open shrub and reaches 2 m (6.6 ft) high. Like other members of the pea family it has phyllodes rather than leaves. These are variable in shape, ranging from obovate (egg-shaped) or oval to linear and measure 2–12 cm (1–4.5 in) long and 0.2–2.5 cm (0.079–0.984 in) wide, and are green in colour with a prominent network of veins. The yellow to red flowers appear from August to December, but peak in Spring over September and October, and are arranged in groups of 5 to 20 in umbelliform or corymbose racemes. The seed pods ripen in November and December.

The corymbose flowerheads of Daviesia corymbosa distinguish it from other bitter pea species. Furthermore, its green phyllodes contrast with the pale grey-green phyllodes of D. laevis and D. latifolia.

== Distribution and habitat ==
Daviesia corymbosa is endemic to New South Wales, where it is found on sandstone soils east of the Great Dividing Range from Myall Lakes to Green Cape. The habitat is dry sclerophyll forest or heath. Associated species include red bloodwood (Corymbia gummifera), yellow bloodwood (C. eximia), narrow-leaved apple (Angophora bakeri), smooth-barked apple (A. costata), and silvertop ash (Eucalyptus sieberi), and watergum (Tristaniopsis laurina) and scrub beefwood (Stenocarpus salignus) along creeks.

== Ecology ==
Daviesia corymbosa regenerates from bushfire by resprouting. It is a host plant for the jewel beetle species Ethonion jessicae. The beetle larvae live in galls on the stems of host plants.

== Cultivation ==
Peas of the genus Daviesia are only rarely grown in cultivation. A showy plant when in flower, D. corymbosa can grow in well-drained soils in sun or dappled shade. It can be propagated by seed to cuttings.
