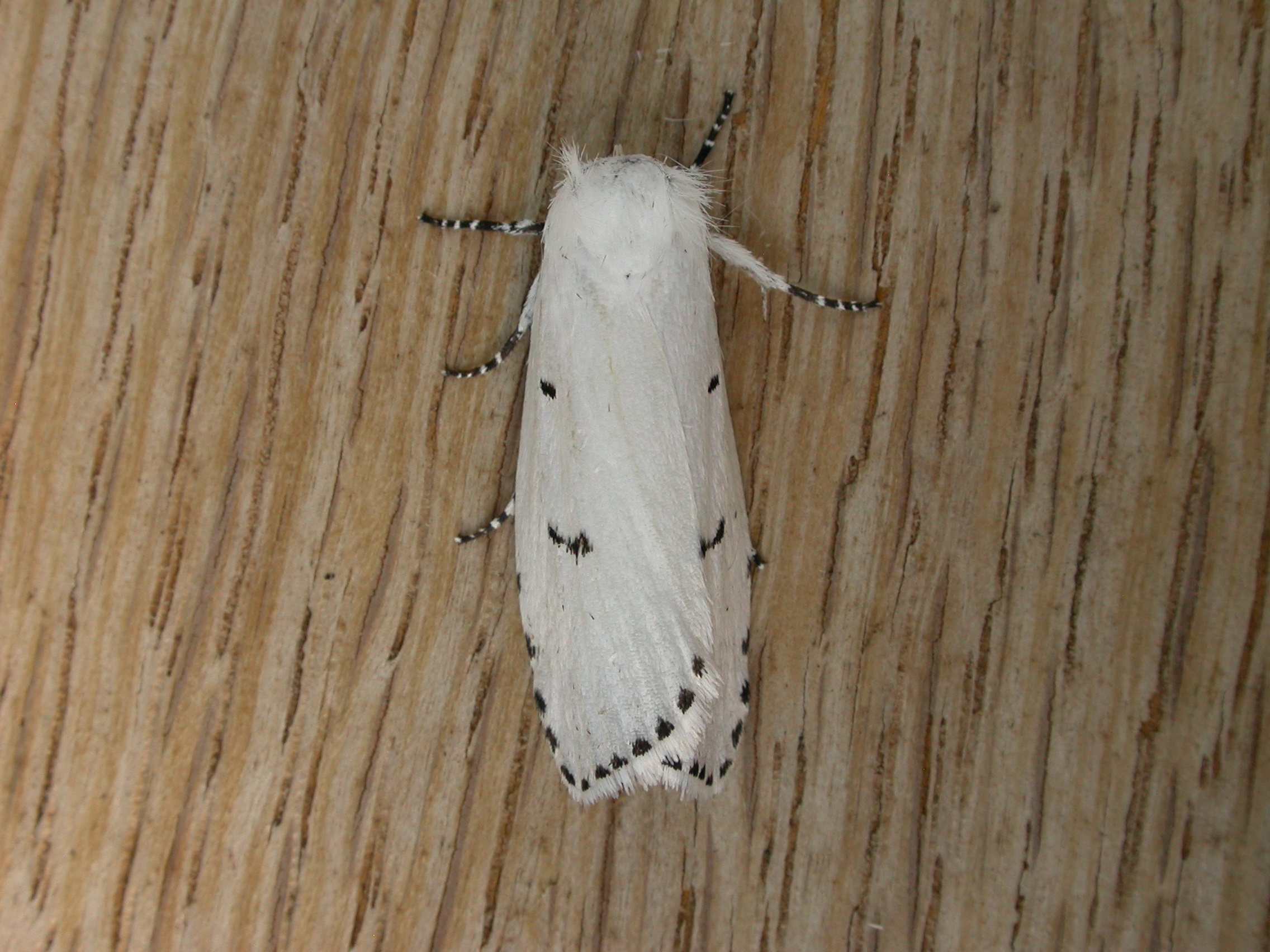

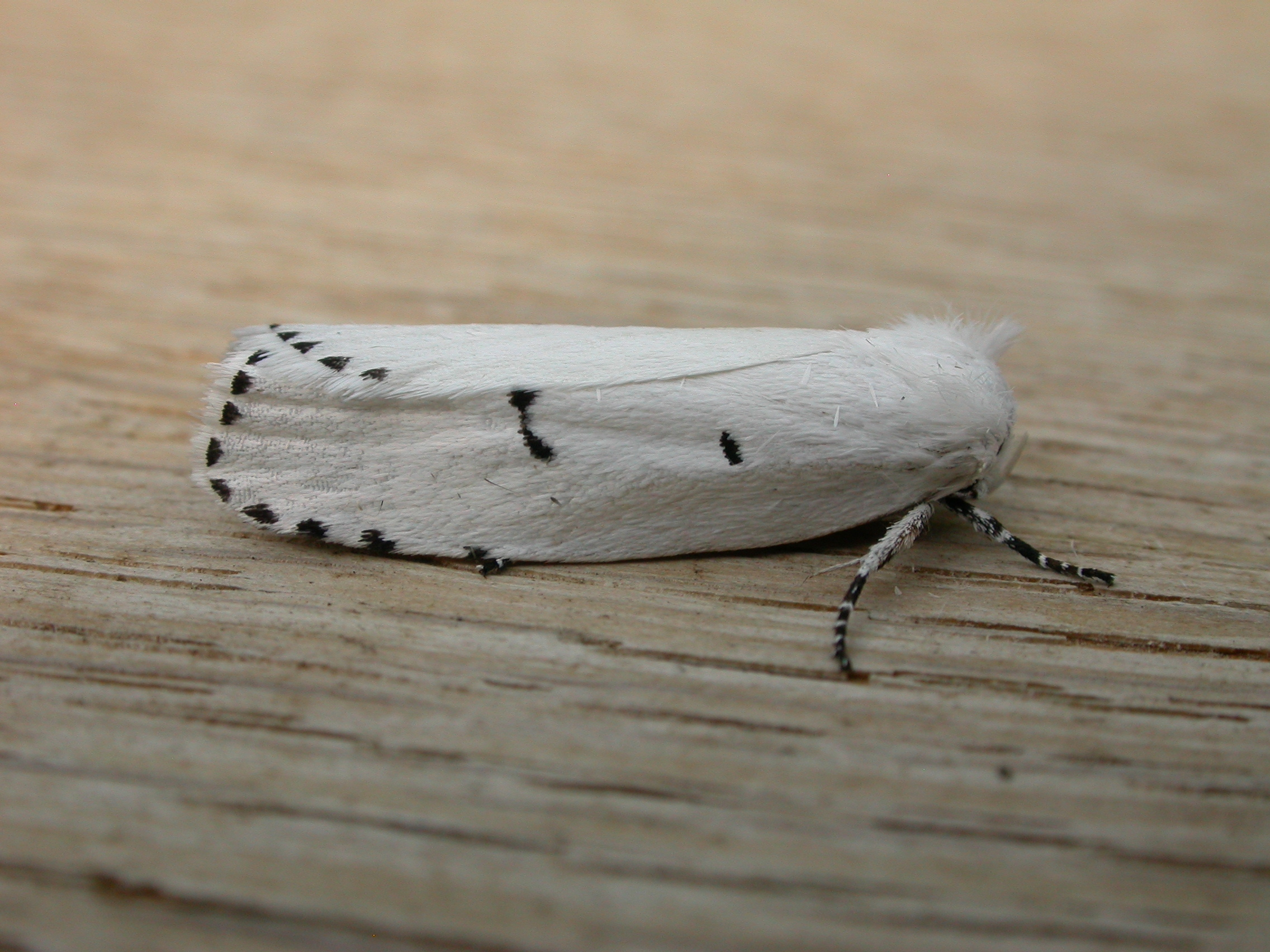

Scientific classification
- Kingdom: Animalia
- Phylum: Arthropoda
- Clade: Pancrustacea
- Class: Insecta
- Order: Lepidoptera
- Family: Xyloryctidae
- Genus: Cryptophasa
- Species: C. pultenae

Binomial name
- Cryptophasa pultenae Lewin, 1805

Synonyms
- Cryptophaga pultenae; Cryptophasa pultenaeae; Cryptophaga eugeniae T.P. Lucas, 1900

= Cryptophasa pultenae =

Species of moth

Cryptophasa pultenae is a moth of the family Xyloryctidae. It is known in Australia from New South Wales and Queensland.

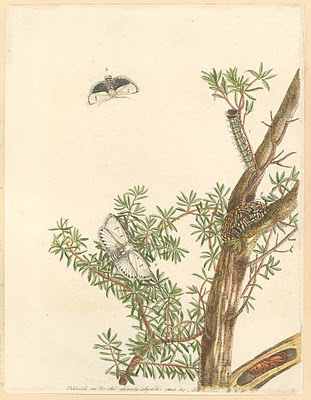
Illustration accompanying the original description

== Description ==
The wingspan is about 25 mm for males and about 40 mm for females. The wings are silvery-white, the anterior pair with three small black spots in the middle and a marginal row at the extremity; hinder wings black in the male, white in the female, with a series of angular black marks at the hinder margin: abdomen with a square spot of bright red toward the base.

== Biology ==
The larvae feed on Pultenaea villosa, Acmena smithii, Backhousia myrtifolia, Syzygium australis and the introduced Psidium guava. The larva bores downwards a cylindrical chamber in the centre of the stem of the host plant. The entrance is arched over with a fabric of web and excrement, under which it feeds during the day. Adults are on wing in November, December, January, February and March.
