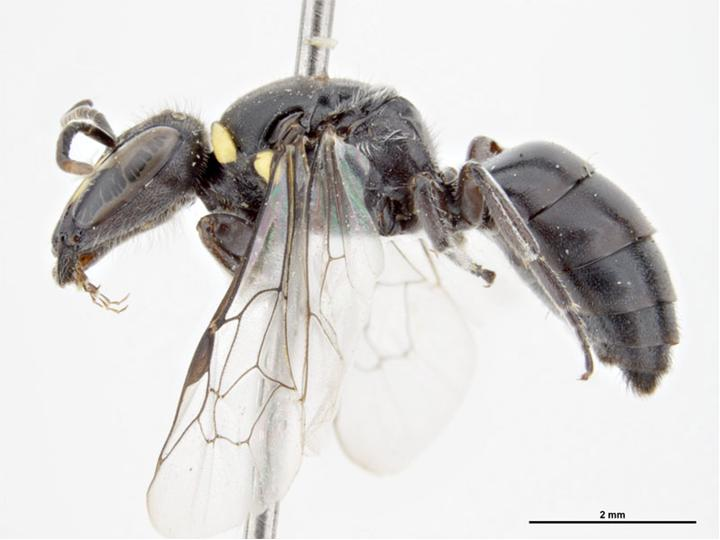
- Female

Scientific classification
- Kingdom: Animalia
- Phylum: Arthropoda
- Clade: Pancrustacea
- Class: Insecta
- Order: Hymenoptera
- Family: Colletidae
- Genus: Hylaeus
- Species: H. scutaticornis

Binomial name
- Hylaeus scutaticornis Michener, 1965

= Hylaeus scutaticornis =

Species of bee

Hylaeus scutaticornis, or Hylaeus (Xenohylaeus) scutaticornis, is a species of bee in the family Colletidae and subfamily Hylaeinae. It is endemic to Australia. It was described by American entomologist Charles Duncan Michener in 1965.

== Etymology ==
The specific epithet scutaticornis alludes to the shieldlike scape of the antenna.

== Description ==
Male body length is 6.5 mm, wing length 5 mm; female body length 6.5 mm, wing length 5 mm. Integumental colouration is mainly black, with yellow markings.

== Distribution and habitat ==
The species occurs across southern mainland Australia. The type locality is Cottonvale in southern Queensland.

Daviesia corymbosa (narrow-leaf bitter-pea), a forage plant of the bees

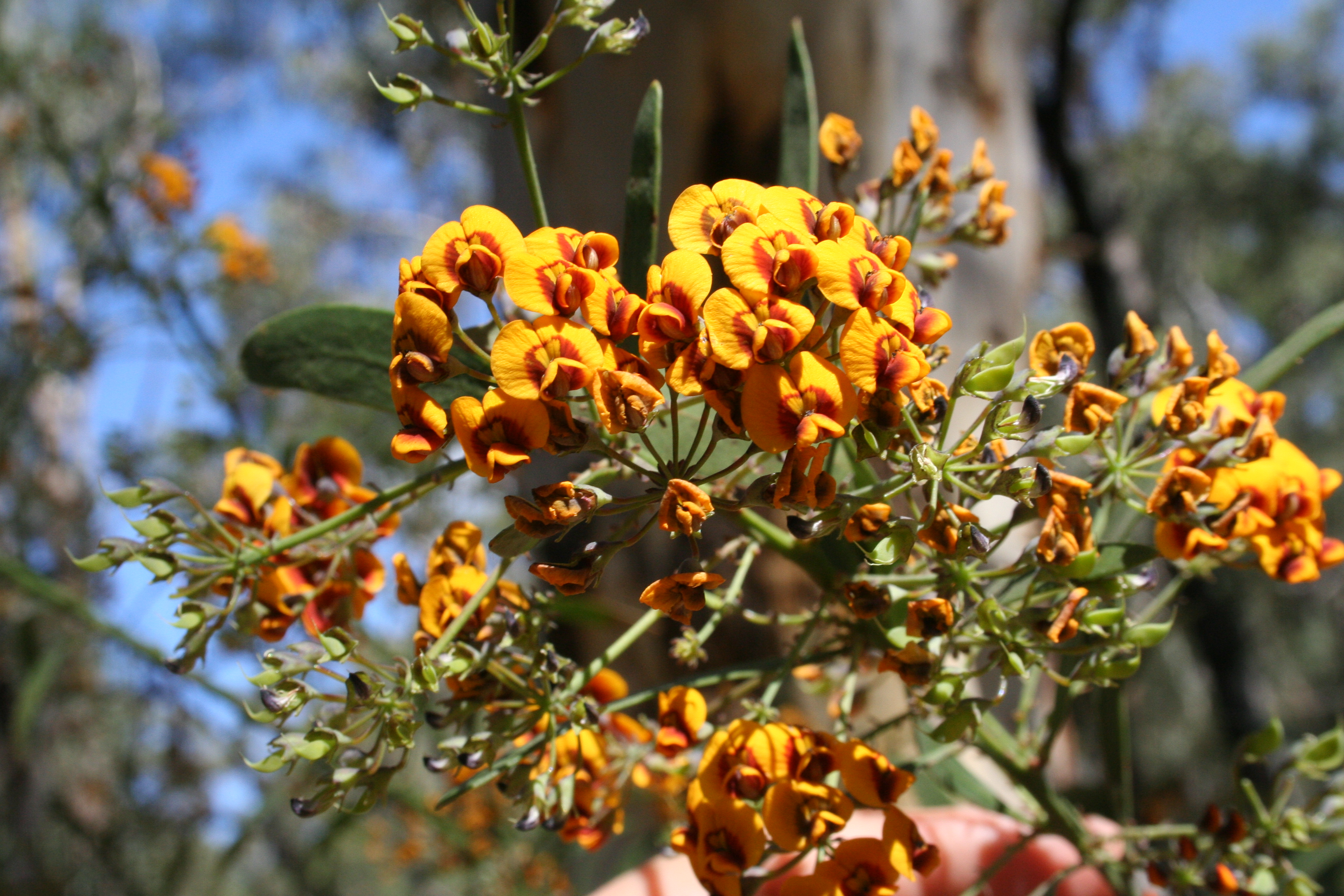
Flowers of Daviesia Corymbosa

== Behaviour ==
The adults are flying mellivores. Flowering plants visited by the bees include Daviesia corymbosa, as well as Jacksonia and Pultenaea species.

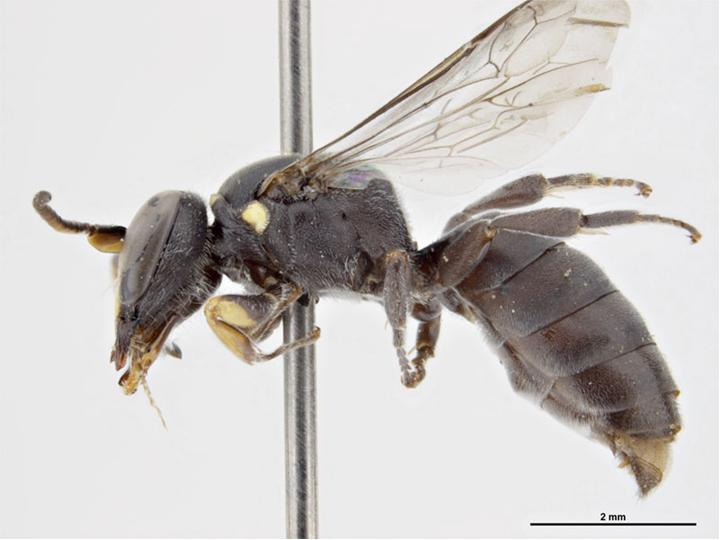
Male
