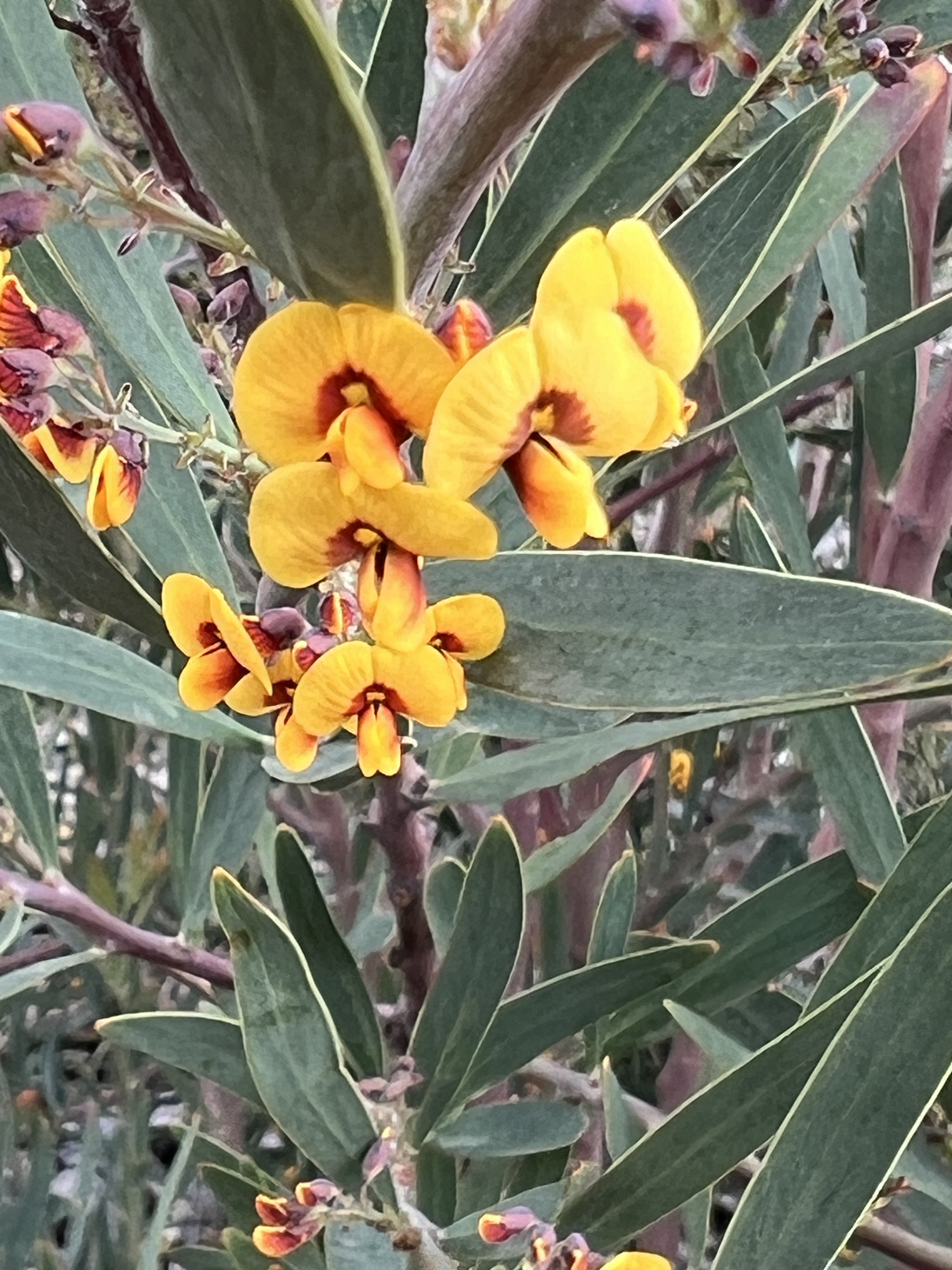

Conservation status
- Vulnerable (EPBC Act)

Scientific classification
- Kingdom: Plantae
- Clade: Tracheophytes
- Clade: Angiosperms
- Clade: Eudicots
- Clade: Rosids
- Order: Fabales
- Family: Fabaceae
- Subfamily: Faboideae
- Genus: Daviesia
- Species: D. laevis

Binomial name
- Daviesia laevis Crisp

= Daviesia laevis =

Grampians bitter-pea

Species of flowering plant

Daviesia laevis is a species of flowering plant in the family Fabaceae and is endemic to the Grampians in Victoria, Australia. It is an open, erect shrub with arching branchlets, scattered narrow elliptic to linear phyllodes and orange-yellow and brownish-red flowers.

== Description ==
Daviesia laevis is a slender, open, erect shrub that typically grows to a height of 2–4 m (6 ft 7 in – 13 ft 1 in), and usually has arching branchlets. Its phyllodes are scattered, narrowly elliptic to linear, 40–150 mm (1.6–5.9 in) long and 5–20 mm (0.20–0.79 in) wide. The flowers are arranged in up to three groups of five to ten in leaf axils on peduncles 2–10 mm (0.079–0.394 in) long, the rachis usually 20–30 mm (0.79–1.18 in) long, each flower on a pedicel 1.5–4 mm (0.059–0.157 in) long. The sepals are 4.5–5.0 mm (0.18–0.20 in) long and joined at the base, the upper two lobes joined for most of their length and the lower three are triangular and about 0.5 mm (0.020 in) long. The standard petal is egg-shaped with a notched tip, 8.5–11 mm (0.33–0.43 in) long and orange-yellow with a brownish-red centre, the wings 8.5–9.5 mm (0.33–0.37 in) long and brownish-red with a yellow tip, and the keel 5.5–6.0 mm (0.22–0.24 in) long and dull red. Flowering occurs in October and November and the fruit is a flattened, triangular pod 7–10 mm (0.28–0.39 in) long.

== Taxonomy and naming ==
Daviesia laevis was first formally described in 1991 by Michael Crisp in Australian Systematic Botany from specimens collected in the Mount Difficult Range in 1989. The specific epithet (laevis) means "smooth".

== Distribution and habitat ==
This daviesia grows in sheltered montane gullies, in open forest or tea-tree thickets near streams and is found in isolated populations in the Grampians and nearby ranges of Victoria.

== Conservation status ==
Daviesia laevis is listed as "vulnerable" under the Australian Government Environment Protection and Biodiversity Conservation Act 1999 and the Victorian Government Flora and Fauna Guarantee Act 1988, and a National Recovery Plan has been prepared. The main threats to the species include inappropriate fire regimes, grazing by kangaroos and its low population size.
