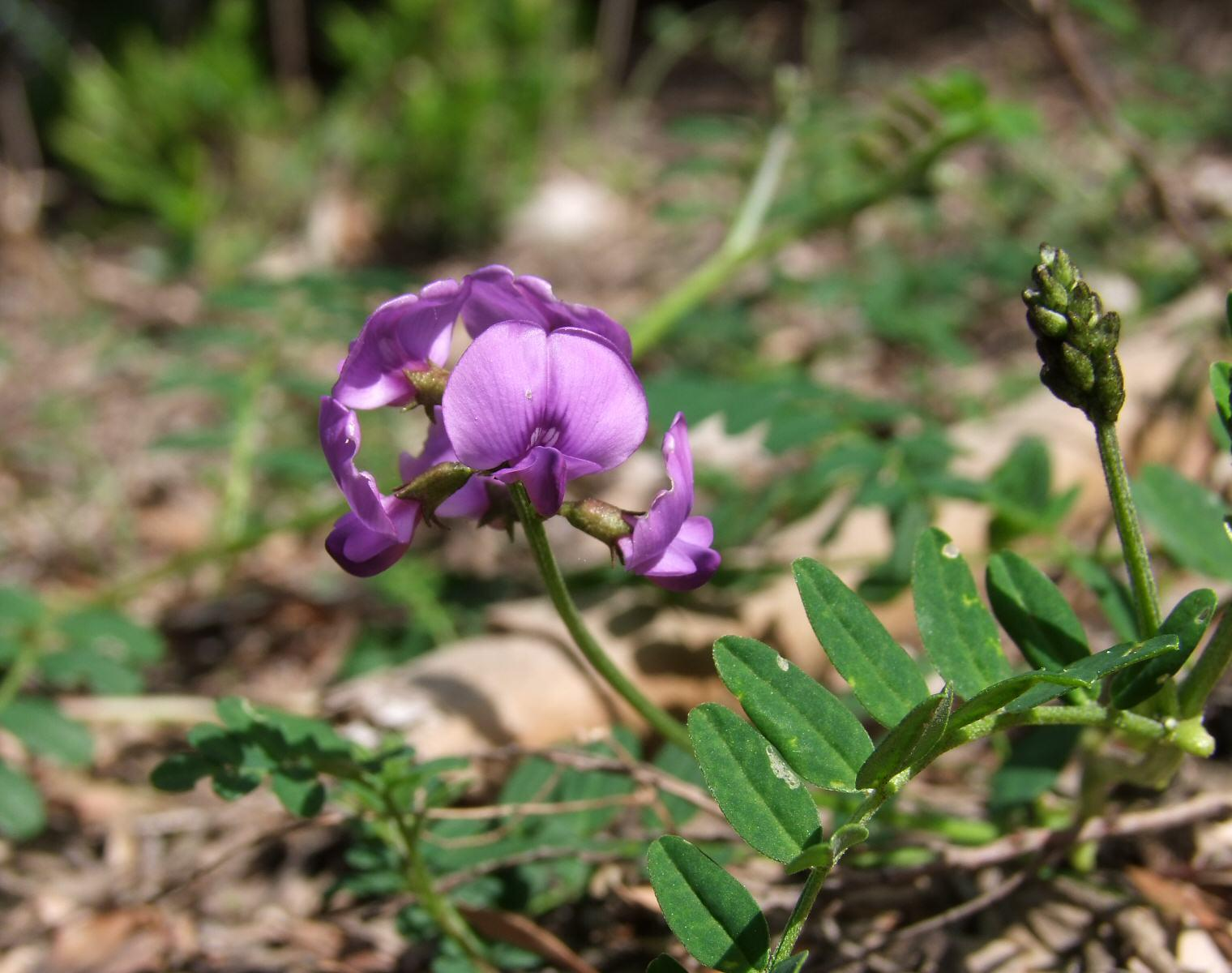
- At Cape Schanck

Scientific classification
- Kingdom: Plantae
- Clade: Tracheophytes
- Clade: Angiosperms
- Clade: Eudicots
- Clade: Rosids
- Order: Fabales
- Family: Fabaceae
- Subfamily: Faboideae
- Genus: Swainsona
- Species: S. lessertiifolia

Binomial name
- Swainsona lessertiifolia DC.

Synonyms
- Swainsona astragalifolia Sweet nom. inval., nom. nud.; Swainsona froebelii Regel; Swainsona lessertiaefolia DC. orth. var.; Swainsona lessertiifolia DC. var. lessertiifolia; Swainsonia lessertiifolia F.Muell. orth. var.

= Swainsona lessertiifolia =

Species of plant

Swainsona lessertiifolia, commonly known as coast swainson-pea, bog pea, Darling pea poison pea or poison vetch is an erect or ascending perennial herb in the pea family and is endemic to south-eastern Australia. It has 13 to 21 narrowly elliptic to elliptic leaflets, and racemes of mostly 12 to 25 usually purplish, rarely white flowers.

== Description ==
Swainsona lessertiifolia is an erect or ascending perennial herb that typically grows up to 50 cm (20 in) tall. Its leaves are mostly 60–90 mm (2.4–3.5 in) long with 13 to 21 narrowly elliptic to elliptic leaflets 4–25 mm (0.16–0.98 in) long and 2–10 mm (0.079–0.394 in) wide with hairy stipules 2–7 mm (0.079–0.276 in) long at the base of the petioles. The flowers are arranged in racemes mostly 100–300 mm (3.9–11.8 in) long with 12 to 25 flowers on a peduncle 1–2 mm (0.039–0.079 in) wide, each flower 8–10 mm (0.31–0.39 in) long on a hairy pedicel about 2–4 mm (0.079–0.157 in) long. The sepals are joined at the base, forming a hairy black, bell-shaped tube 2.0–2.5 mm (0.079–0.098 in) long, the sepal lobes usually shorter than the tube. The petals are dark to pale purple, rarely white, the standard petal 10–11 mm (0.39–0.43 in) long and 8–16 mm (0.31–0.63 in) wide, the wings 7–8 mm (0.28–0.31 in) long, and the keel 8–10 mm (0.31–0.39 in) long and 4 mm (0.16 in) deep. Flowering mostly occurs from August to January and the fruit is elliptic, 10–30 mm (0.39–1.18 in) and 5–8 mm (0.20–0.31 in) wide.

== Taxonomy ==
Swainsona lessertiifolia was first formally described in 1825 by Augustin Pyramus de Candolle in Annales des Sciences Naturelles.

== Distribution and habitat ==
This species of swainsona occurs in South Australia, Victoria and Tasmania, often on sand hummocks in near-coastal areas. In South Australia it is found in the south-east of the state, in Victoria it is abundant, mostly west of Wilsons Promontory and in Tasmania grows at Woolnorth, St Marys and on Bass Strait Islands.
