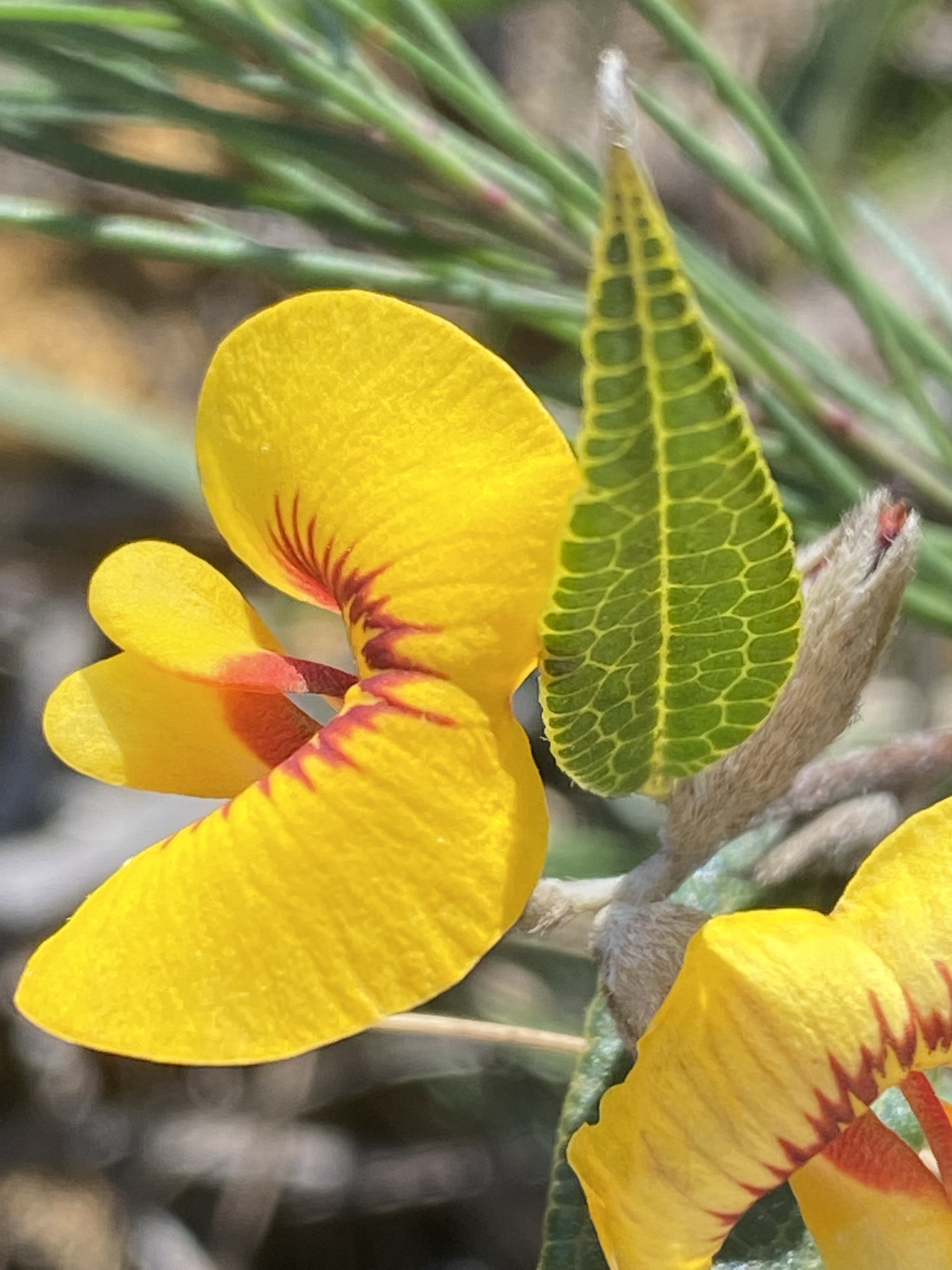
- Near Penrose

Scientific classification
- Kingdom: Plantae
- Clade: Tracheophytes
- Clade: Angiosperms
- Clade: Eudicots
- Clade: Rosids
- Order: Fabales
- Family: Fabaceae
- Subfamily: Faboideae
- Genus: Mirbelia
- Species: M. platylobioides

Binomial name
- Mirbelia platylobioides (DC.) Joy Thomps.

Synonyms
- Chorizema platylobioides DC.; Mirbelia grandiflora Aiton ex Hook.; Platylobium reticulatum Sieber ex Spreng.

= Mirbelia platylobioides =

Species of legume

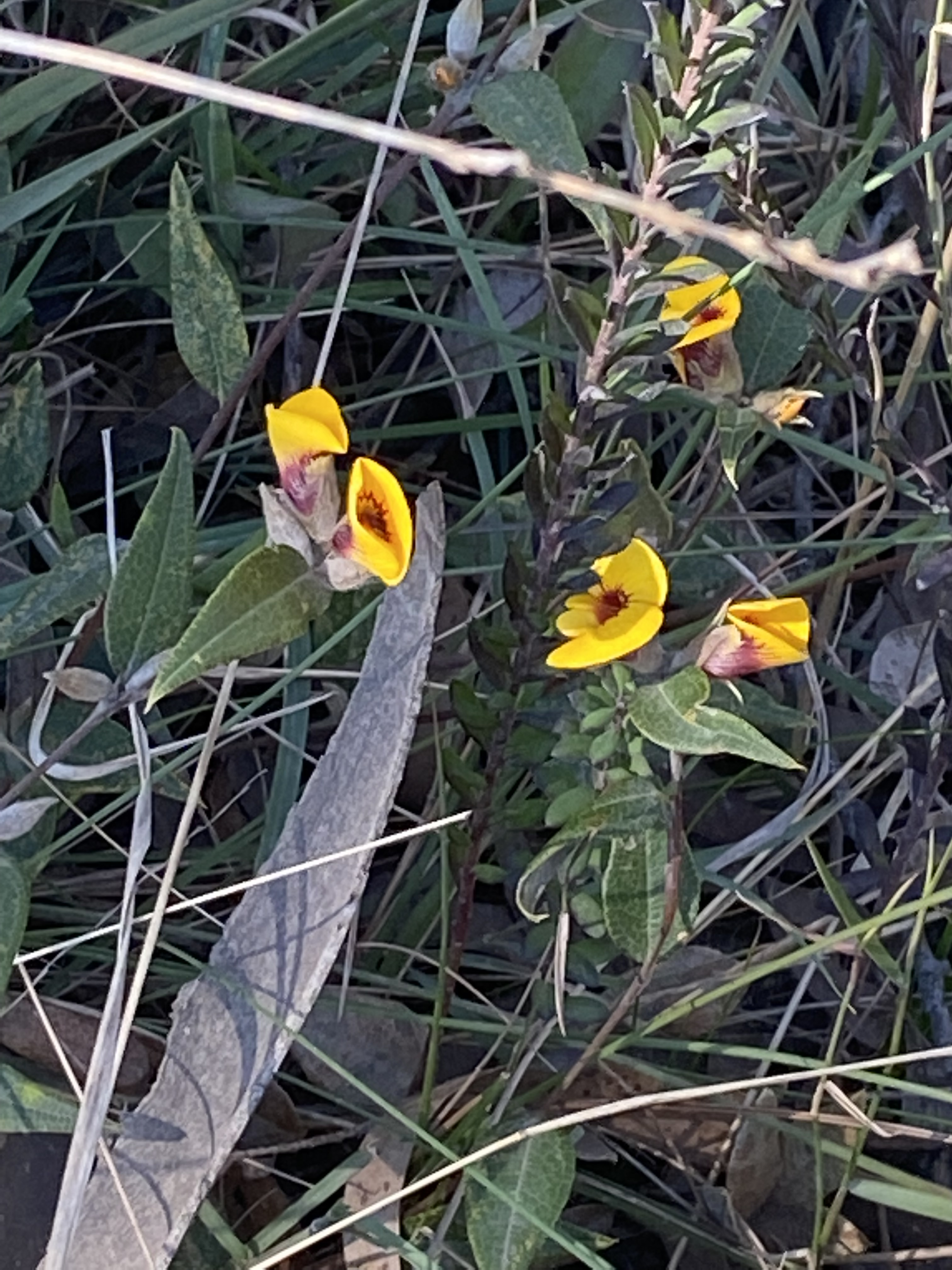
Habit

Mirbelia platylobioides is a flowering plant in the family Fabaceae. It is a small, prostrate plant with trailing stems, yellow and red pea flowers and ovate leaves. It is endemic to New South Wales.

== Description ==
Mirbelia platylobioides is a small, scrambling, prostrate plant with soft, hairy stems to about 40 cm (16 in) long. The leaves are narrow-oval to oval shaped, stiff, 15–40 mm (0.59–1.57 in) long and 5–15 mm (0.20–0.59 in) wide, upper surface shiny and veined, silky-hairy below, arranged opposite or alternate ending in a point at the apex. The flowers are more or less sessile borne in small groups or rarely singly in leaf axils or at the end of branches. The corolla 14–18 mm (0.55–0.71 in) long, yellow to orange with a red centre, calyx, 7–9 mm (0.28–0.35 in) long with soft, silky hairs, lobes tapering to a point more or less equal to the length of the floral tube. Flowering occurs in spring and the fruit is a pod 15–20 mm (0.59–0.79 in) long, compressed with silky hairs.

== Taxonomy ==
This species was first formally described in 1825 by Augustin Pyramus de Candolle who gave it the name Chorizema platyloboides in Prodromus Systematis Naturalis Regni Vegetabilis. In 1958 Joy Thompson changed the name to Mirbelia platylobioides and the change was published in Proceedings of the Linnean Society of New South Wales.

== Distribution and habitat ==
This mirbelia grows in open woodland in heath and sandy soils south from Rylstone, in the Southern Highlands, Blue Mountains to Eden.
