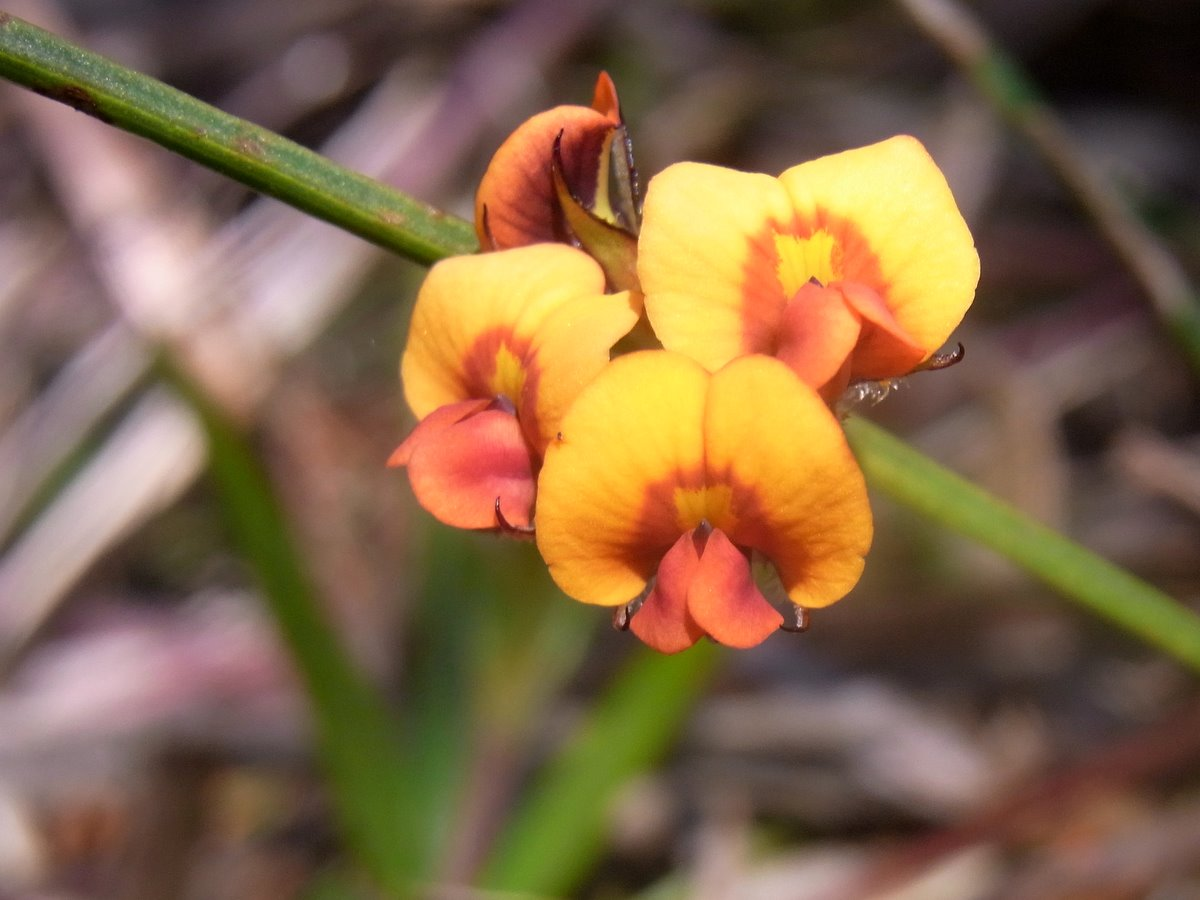
- In Ku-ring-gai Chase National Park

Scientific classification
- Kingdom: Plantae
- Clade: Embryophytes
- Clade: Tracheophytes
- Clade: Spermatophytes
- Clade: Angiosperms
- Clade: Eudicots
- Clade: Rosids
- Order: Fabales
- Family: Fabaceae
- Subfamily: Faboideae
- Genus: Daviesia
- Species: D. alata

Binomial name
- Daviesia alata Sm.

= Daviesia alata =

Species of legume

Daviesia alata is a species of flowering plant in the family Fabaceae and is endemic to south-eastern New South Wales. It is a prostrate to low-lying shrub with winged branchlets that are triangular in cross-section, phyllodes reduced to scales, and orange, red, yellow and maroon flowers.

== Description ==
Daviesia alata is a prostrate or low-lying shrub that typically spreads up to 1 m (3 ft 3 in) in diameter with stems up to 40 cm (16 in) long. The branchlets are triangular in cross-section, winged and dark green. The phyllodes are reduced to scales on mature plants but are egg-shaped to linear, 30–60 mm (1.2–2.4 in) long and 3–12 mm (0.12–0.47 in) wide on young plants. The flowers are arranged in leaf axils in groups of two to five on a peduncle 0.8–3.5 mm (0.031–0.138 in) long, each flower on a pedicel about 1.5 mm (0.059 in) long. The five sepals are 4.5–6.0 mm (0.18–0.24 in) long, the lobes about 2.5 mm (0.098 in) long. The standard petal is orange-red with a yellow centre, 6–7 mm (0.24–0.28 in) long, the wings maroon and about 6 mm (0.24 in) long and the keel maroon and about 4 mm (0.16 in) long. Flowering occurs from October to December and the fruit is a flattened triangular pod 9–10 mm (0.35–0.39 in) long.

== Taxonomy ==
Daviesia alata was first formally described in 1808 by James Edward Smith in Rees's Cyclopædia from specimens collected "near Port Jackson".

== Distribution and habitat ==
This pea grows in heath and forest on the coast and ranges of south-eastern New South Wales between Nelson Bay, the Budawangs and the Blue Mountains.
