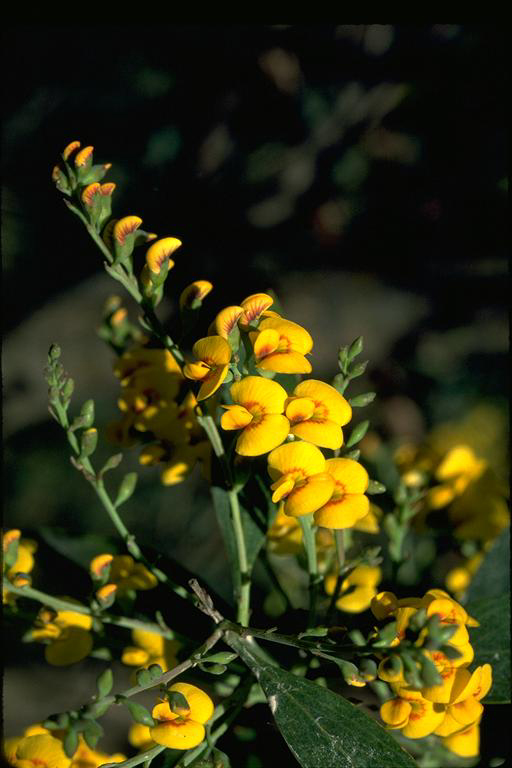

Scientific classification
- Kingdom: Plantae
- Clade: Tracheophytes
- Clade: Angiosperms
- Clade: Eudicots
- Clade: Rosids
- Order: Fabales
- Family: Fabaceae
- Subfamily: Faboideae
- Genus: Daviesia
- Species: D. laxiflora

Binomial name
- Daviesia laxiflora Crisp

= Daviesia laxiflora =

Species of flowering plant

Daviesia laxiflora is a species of flowering plant in the family Fabaceae and is endemic to eastern Victoria, Australia. It is a large shrub or small tree with drooping branches, linear to narrow elliptic phyllodes and long racemes of mostly bright yellow flowers.

== Description ==
Daviesia laxiflora is a shrub or tree that typically grows to a height of up to 10 m (33 ft), and has drooping branches. Its phyllodes are linear to narrowly elliptic, 40–160 mm (1.6–6.3 in) long, 5–30 mm (0.20–1.18 in) wide and wavy with minutely scalloped edges. The flowers are arranged in leaf axils on up to five racemes, each with many flowers on peduncles 7–15 mm (0.28–0.59 in) long, the rachis usually 40–120 mm (1.6–4.7 in) long, each flower on a pedicel 1–7 mm (0.039–0.276 in) long with a bract 1–2 mm (0.039–0.079 in) long at the base. The sepals are 4.5–5.5 mm (0.18–0.22 in) long and joined at the base, the upper two lobes joined for most of their length and the lower three triangular and about 0.5 mm (0.020 in) long. The standard petal is elliptic, 8.5–10.5 mm (0.33–0.41 in) long and bright yellow with brownish-red markings, the wings 8–9 mm (0.31–0.35 in) long and yellow with brownish-red markings, and the keel 5.0–5.5 mm (0.20–0.22 in) long. Flowering occurs from October and January and the fruit is a strongly flattened, triangular pod 7–10 mm (0.28–0.39 in) long.

== Taxonomy and naming ==
This daviesia was first formally described in 1957 by James Hamlyn Willis who gave it the name Daviesia corymbosa var. laxiflora in The Victorian Naturalist from specimens he collected in 1940. In 1991, Michael Crisp raised the variety to species status as Daviesia laxiflora in Australian Systematic Botany. The specific epithet (laxiflora) means "loose-flowered".

== Distribution and habitat ==
Daviesia laxiflora mostly grows in moist, montane forests at altitudes of 900–1,300 m (3,000–4,300 ft) in eastern Victoria, with a disjunct population at Wilsons Promontory.
