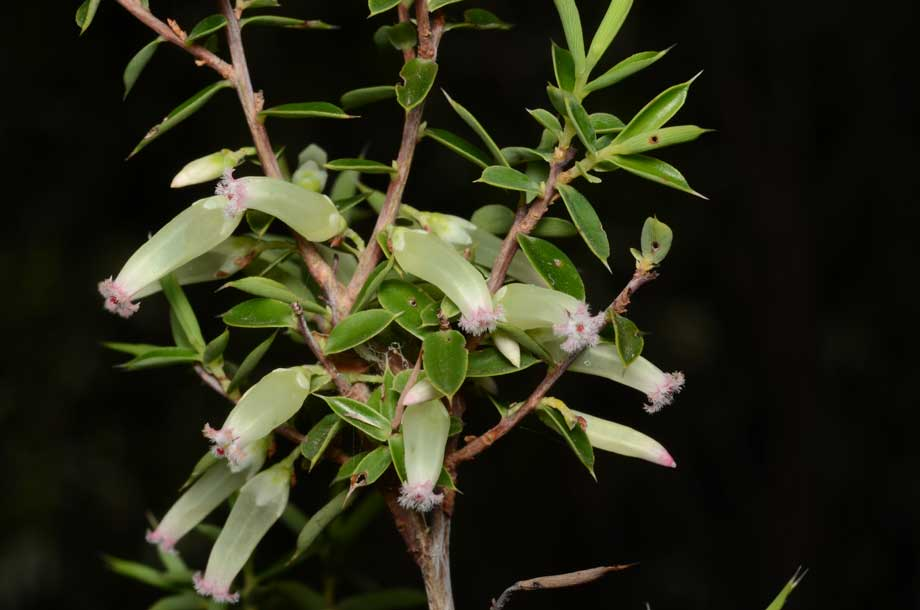
- Near Goondiwindi

Scientific classification
- Kingdom: Plantae
- Clade: Tracheophytes
- Clade: Angiosperms
- Clade: Eudicots
- Clade: Asterids
- Order: Ericales
- Family: Ericaceae
- Genus: Styphelia
- Species: S. biflora

Binomial name
- Styphelia biflora (R.Br.) Spreng.
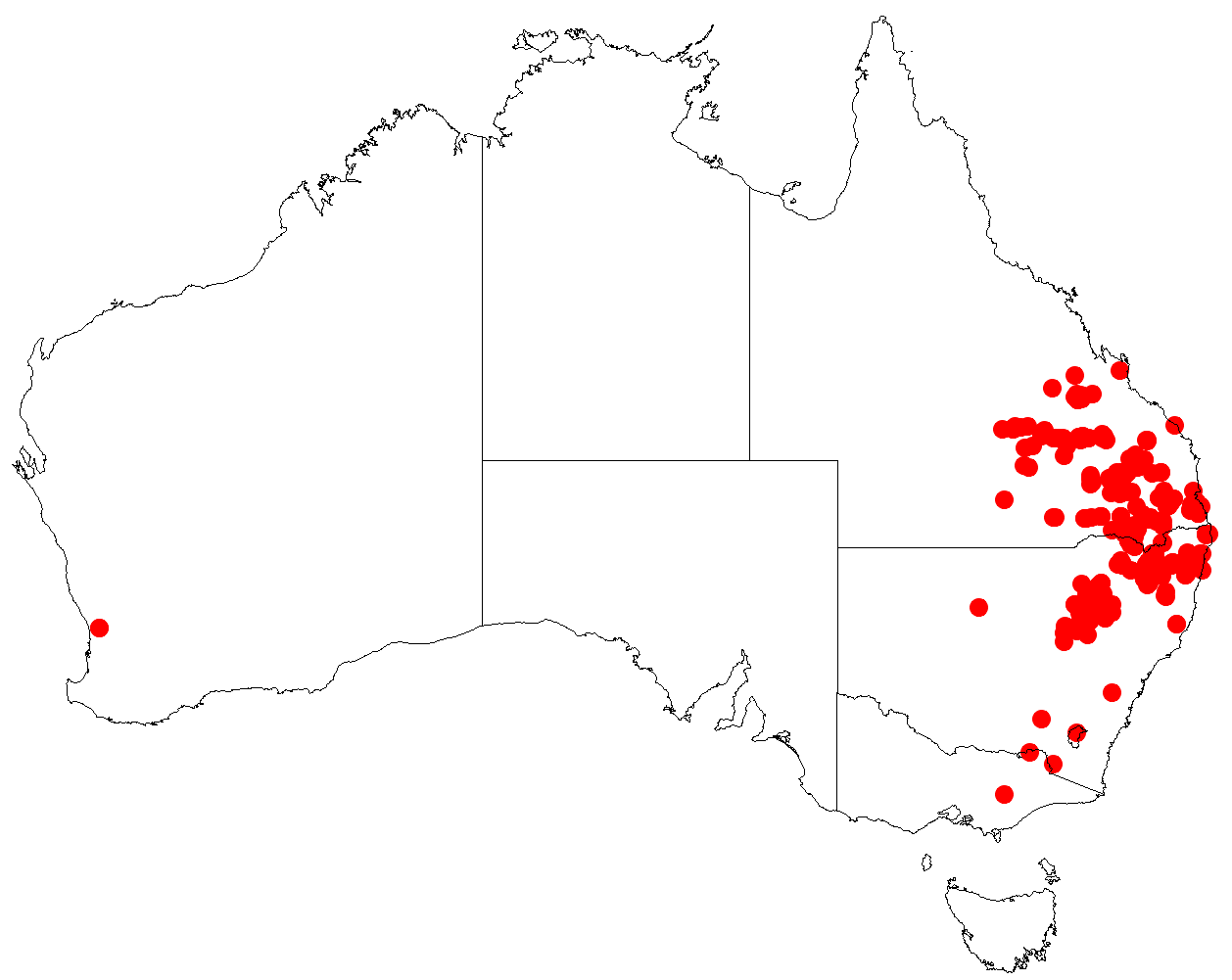
- Occurrence data from AVH

Synonyms
- Leucopogon biflorus R.Br.; Leucopogon similis Sond.; Leucopogon sparsus A.Cunn. ex DC.

= Styphelia biflora =

Species of shrub

Styphelia biflora is a species of flowering plant in the heath family Ericaceae and is endemic to eastern Australia. It is an erect to spreading shrub with hairy branchlets, oblong leaves and small white flowers.

== Description ==
Styphelia biflora is an erect to spreading shrub that typically grows to a height of 0.4–2 m (1 ft 4 in – 6 ft 7 in) and has bristly hairs on the branchlets. The leaves are glabrous, oblong, more or less flat, 9–17 mm (0.35–0.67 in) long, 2.0–2.7 mm (0.079–0.106 in) wide and sessile. The flowers are arranged singly or in pairs in leaf axils on a peduncle 1.0–1.5 mm (0.039–0.059 in) long with bracteoles 1.2–1.6 mm (0.047–0.063 in) long. The petals form a tube 2.5–3.7 mm (0.098–0.146 in) long with lobes 3.2–3.6 mm (0.13–0.14 in) long and hairy near the ends. Flowering occurs from July to October and is followed by glabrous, elliptic drupes 3.2–3.7 mm (0.13–0.15 in) long.

== Taxonomy ==
This species was first formally described in 1810 by Robert Brown who gave it the name Leucopogon biflorus in his Prodromus Florae Novae Hollandiae. In 1824, Kurt Polycarp Joachim Sprengel transferred the species to Styphelia as S. biflora in Systema Vegetabilium. The specific epithet (biflora) means "two-flowered".

== Distribution and habitat ==
Styphelia biflora grows in woodland, sometimes on rocky outcrops and occurs in south-east Queensland and as far south as Dunedoo in New South Wales.
