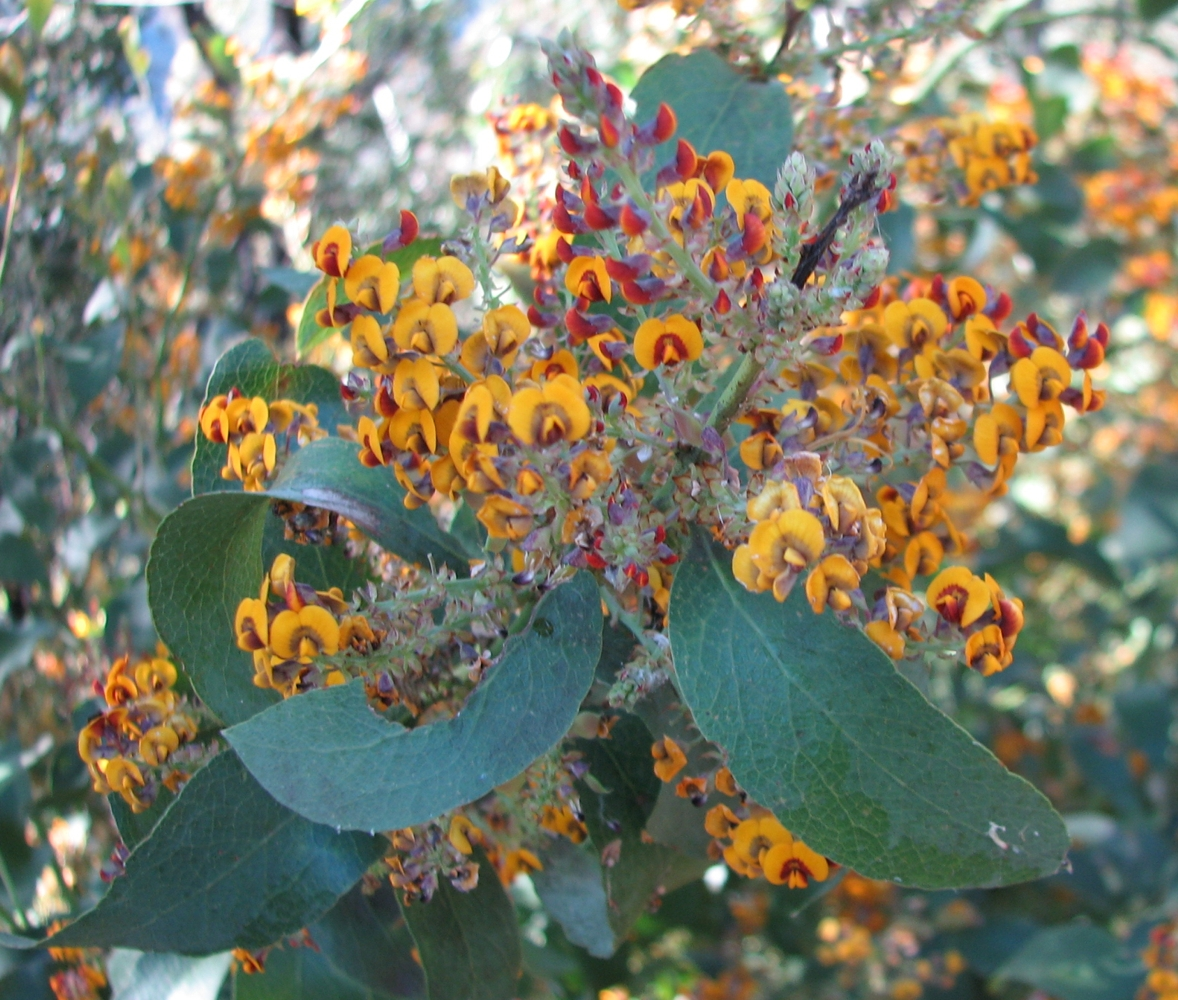
- Daviesia latifolia in Mount Buffalo National Park

Scientific classification
- Kingdom: Plantae
- Clade: Tracheophytes
- Clade: Angiosperms
- Clade: Eudicots
- Clade: Rosids
- Order: Fabales
- Family: Fabaceae
- Subfamily: Faboideae
- Genus: Daviesia
- Species: D. latifolia

Binomial name
- Daviesia latifolia R.Br.

= Daviesia latifolia =

Hop bitter-pea

Species of legume

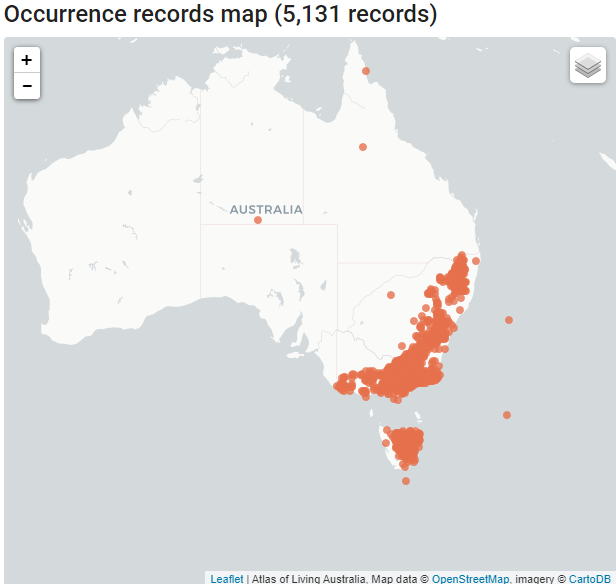
Occurrence data from the Atlas of Living Australia

Daviesia latifolia, commonly known as hop bitter-pea, is a species of flowering plant in the family Fabaceae and is endemic to south-eastern Australia. It is a slender, erect, spreading shrub with elliptic, egg-shaped or lance-shaped phyllodes and orange-yellow and maroon flowers in long racemes.

== Description ==
Daviesia latifolia is a slender, erect shrub that typically grows to 1–5 m (3 ft 3 in – 16 ft 5 in) high and 1.0–1.5 m (3 ft 3 in – 4 ft 11 in) wide and has arching, glabrous branches. Adult phyllodes are elliptic to egg-shaped or lance-shaped, 20–150 mm (0.79–5.91 in) long and 5–70 mm (0.20–2.76 in) wide on a petiole-like base 3–20 mm (0.12–0.79 in) long. The phyllodes are wavy with scalloped edges and have prominent veins. Juvenile phyllodes are slightly broader.

The flowers are borne in leaf axils along up to three racemes, the peduncle 10–20 mm (0.39–0.79 in) long, the rachis 25–80 mm (0.98–3.15 in) long, each flower on a pedicel 1.5–4 mm (0.059–0.157 in) long. The sepals are 3–5 mm (0.12–0.20 in) long and joined at the base, the upper two joined for most of their length and the lower three triangular and 0.5–1 mm (0.020–0.039 in) long. The standard petal is broadly egg-shaped, 6–9 mm (0.24–0.35 in) long and orange-yellow and maroon with a yellow centre, the wings 5.5–8 mm (0.22–0.31 in) long and yellow and maroon, and the keel 4.5–5.5 mm (0.18–0.22 in) long and maroon. Flowering occurs from September to December and the fruit is triangular pod 6.5–11 mm (0.26–0.43 in) long.

== Taxonomy ==
Daviesia latifolia was first formally described in 1811 by Robert Brown in Aiton's Hortus Kewensis. The specific epithet (latifolia) means "broad-leaved".

== Distribution and habitat ==
Hop bitter-pea grows in forest, often as an understorey plant and occurs at altitudes up to 1,800 m (5,900 ft), from the Granite Belt of south-eastern Queensland, through the tablelands, western slopes and south coast of New South Wales, to most of Victoria apart, from the north west of the state. It is also common in dry woodlands in Tasmania.

== Ecology ==
This daviesia provides nectar for a range of insects and native birds.

== Uses ==
=== Use in horticulture ===
The species is useful as an ornamental, as a windbreak and in nitrogen-fixing. It prefers well-drained soil in full sun and is frost tolerant.

=== Other uses ===
The stems and phyllodes can be used with alum to produce a fawn dye used as a mordant. The phyllodes also have reputed medicinal properties, and were also substituted as hops to flavour beer. Early European settlers used the leaves as a drug to expel intestinal worms, including hydatid cysts, and also as tonic.
