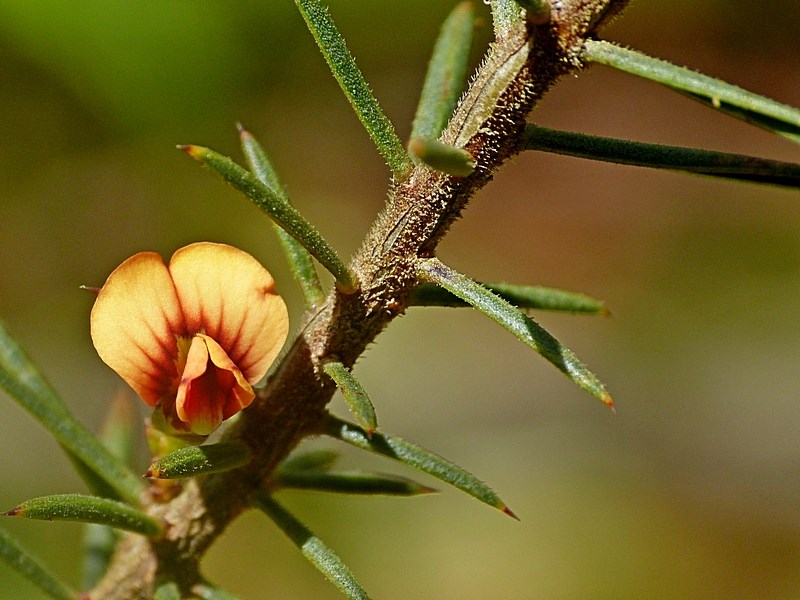

Scientific classification
- Kingdom: Plantae
- Clade: Tracheophytes
- Clade: Angiosperms
- Clade: Eudicots
- Clade: Rosids
- Order: Fabales
- Family: Fabaceae
- Subfamily: Faboideae
- Genus: Daviesia
- Species: D. acicularis

Binomial name
- Daviesia acicularis Sm.

Synonyms
- Daviesia pungens Benth.

= Daviesia acicularis =

Sharp bitter-pea

Species of flowering plant

Daviesia acicularis, commonly known as sharp bitter-pea, is a species of flowering plant in the family Fabaceae and is endemic to eastern Australia. It is a small, wiry shrub with tapering, linear phyllodes, and single yellow to orange and dark red flowers.

== Description ==
Daviesia acicularis is a wiry shrub that typically grows to a height of up to 1 m (3 ft 3 in) and has hairy foliage. The phyllodes are tapering linear to narrow elliptic, 10–65 mm (0.39–2.56 in) long and 0.5–10 mm (0.020–0.394 in) wide with the edges curved downwards or rolled under and a prominent mid-vein on the upper surface. The flowers are 5–7 mm (0.20–0.28 in) long and arranged singly on a peduncle 1–2 mm (0.039–0.079 in) long. The sepals are 3.5–4.5 mm (0.14–0.18 in) long and joined at the base. The standard petal is yellow to orange with dark red markings and 5–7 mm (0.20–0.28 in) long and the keel is dark red grading to pink near the base. Flowering occurs from August in the north to October in the south and the fruit is a triangular pod 6–9 mm (0.24–0.35 in) long.

== Taxonomy and naming ==
Daviesia acicularis was first formally described in 1805 by James Edward Smith in his book Annals of Botany from specimens collected at Port Jackson.

== Distribution ==
This species of pea grows in forest and hummock grassland from Tambo and Charleville in central Queensland to Eden and inland as far as Cowra, West Wyalong and Enngonia in New South Wales.
