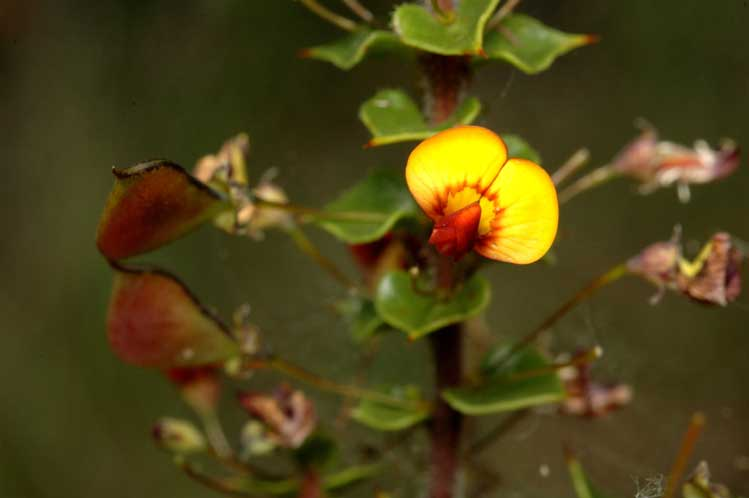
- Near the Shoalhaven River

Scientific classification
- Kingdom: Plantae
- Clade: Tracheophytes
- Clade: Angiosperms
- Clade: Eudicots
- Clade: Rosids
- Order: Fabales
- Family: Fabaceae
- Subfamily: Faboideae
- Genus: Daviesia
- Species: D. squarrosa

Binomial name
- Daviesia squarrosa Sm.

Synonyms
- Daviesia squarrosa Sm. subsp. squarrosa

= Daviesia squarrosa =

Species of flowering plant

Daviesia squarrosa is a species of flowering plant in the family Fabaceae and is endemic to eastern Australia. It is a slender shrub with crowded, heart-shaped phyllodes with a long-tapering tip, and yellow and red flowers.

== Description ==
Daviesia squarrosa is a slender shrub that typically grows to a height of up to 1.5 m (4 ft 11 in) and has short, bristly hairs on the branchlets. The phyllodes are crowded, heart-shaped or egg-shaped, 4–12 mm (0.16–0.47 in) long and 0.5–10 mm (0.020–0.394 in) wide with a long, tapering tip. The flowers are arranged singly or in paris in leaf axils on a peduncle 0.5–1 mm (0.020–0.039 in) long, each flower on a pedicel 3.5–12 mm (0.14–0.47 in) long. The sepals are 2.5–3.0 mm (0.098–0.118 in) long and joined at the base, the upper two lobes joined for most of their length and the lower three 0.5–1 mm (0.020–0.039 in) long. The standard petal is egg-shaped, yellow with red markings and a bright yellow centre, 5.5–5.6 mm (0.22–0.22 in) long and 6.6–7.2 mm (0.26–0.28 in) wide. The wings are 4.5–5.5 mm (0.18–0.22 in) long and red, sometimes with a yellow tip, the keel about 4.5 mm (0.18 in) long and red, sometimes with a yellow tip. Flowering occurs from July October and the fruit is a flattened triangular pod 6–9 mm (0.24–0.35 in) long.

== Taxonomy and naming ==
Daviesia squarrosa was first formally described in 1805 by James Edward Smith in his book Annals of Botany. The specific epithet (squarrosa) means "thickly crowded and rigid", referring to the leaves.

== Distribution ==
This species of pea grows in forest, mainly in near-coastal areas, from south-east Queensland to the Tuross River in New South Wales, but also as far inland as the Megalong Valley and Goulburn.
