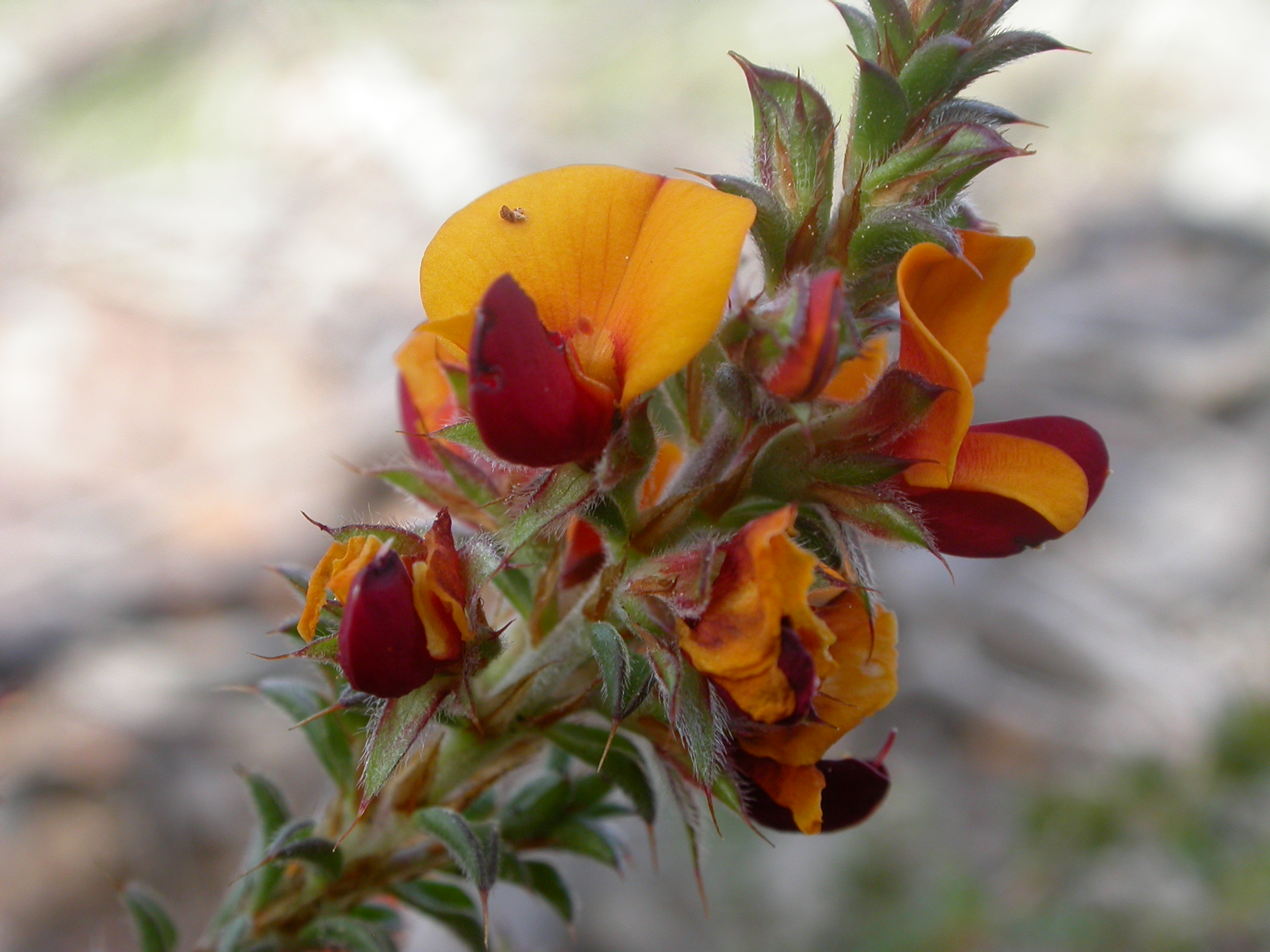
- On Black Mountain in the A.C.T.

Scientific classification
- Kingdom: Plantae
- Clade: Tracheophytes
- Clade: Angiosperms
- Clade: Eudicots
- Clade: Rosids
- Order: Fabales
- Family: Fabaceae
- Subfamily: Faboideae
- Genus: Pultenaea
- Species: P. procumbens

Binomial name
- Pultenaea procumbens A.Cunn.

Synonyms
- List: Pultenaea epacridea F.Muell nom. inval., nom. nud.; Pultenaea epacridea F.Muell. ex Hook.f.; Pultenaea epacridea F.Muell. nom. inval., nom. nud.; Pultenaea setigera A.Cunn. ex Benth.; Pultenaea staphyleoides A.Cunn. ex G.Don; Pultenaea staphyleoides var. mutica F.Muell. ex H.B.Will.; Pultenaea staphyleoides var. mutica F.Muell. ex Ewart nom. illeg.; Pultenaea staphyleoides A.Cunn. ex G.Don var. staphyleoides; Pultenaea staphylioides Joy Thomps. orth. var.; Pultenaea stypheleoides A.D.Chapm. orth. var.; Pultenaea stypheliodes Joy Thomps. orth. var.; Pultenaea styphelioides Steud. orth. var.; Pultenaea styphelioides var. mutica H.B.Will. orth. var.

= Pultenaea procumbens =

Heathy bush-pea

Species of legume

Pultenaea procumbens, commonly known as heathy bush-pea, is a species of flowering plant in the family Fabaceae and is endemic to south-eastern continental Australia. It is a low-lying or spreading shrub with lance-shaped or rhombic leaves and yellow, orange and red flowers.

== Description ==
Pultenaea procumbens is a low-lying or spreading shrub that typically grows to a height of less than 1 m (3 ft 3 in) and has hairy young stems. The leaves are arranged alternately, lance-shaped or rhombic, 4–10 mm (0.16–0.39 in) long, 1–4 mm (0.039–0.157 in) wide with tapering, lance-shaped stipules 3–4 mm (0.12–0.16 in) long at the base. The edges of the leaves curve strongly downwards and there is a sharp point on the tip. The flowers are arranged in dense, leafy clusters of more than three on the ends of branches and are 7–9 mm (0.28–0.35 in) long, each flower on a pedicel 1.5–2.0 mm (0.059–0.079 in) long. The sepals are 5–7 mm (0.20–0.28 in) long, joined at the base, and there are lance-shaped bracteoles 4–5 mm (0.16–0.20 in) long attached to the sepal tube. The standard petal is yellow to red and 7–8 mm (0.28–0.31 in) wide, the wings are yellow to orange and the keel is red. Flowering mainly occurs from October to November and the fruit is an egg-shaped pod about 5 mm (0.20 in) long.

== Taxonomy ==
Pultenaea procumbens was first formally described in 1825 by Allan Cunningham in Barron Field's Geographical Memoirs on New South Wales. The specific epithet (procumbens) means "procumbent".

== Distribution and habitat ==
Heathy bush-pea grows in forest and heath and is found in New South Wales south from the Nandewar Range through the tablelands and South West Slopes of New South Wales and the Australian Capital Territory to northern and eastern Victoria where it occurs in scattered locations, often on rocky hillsides.
