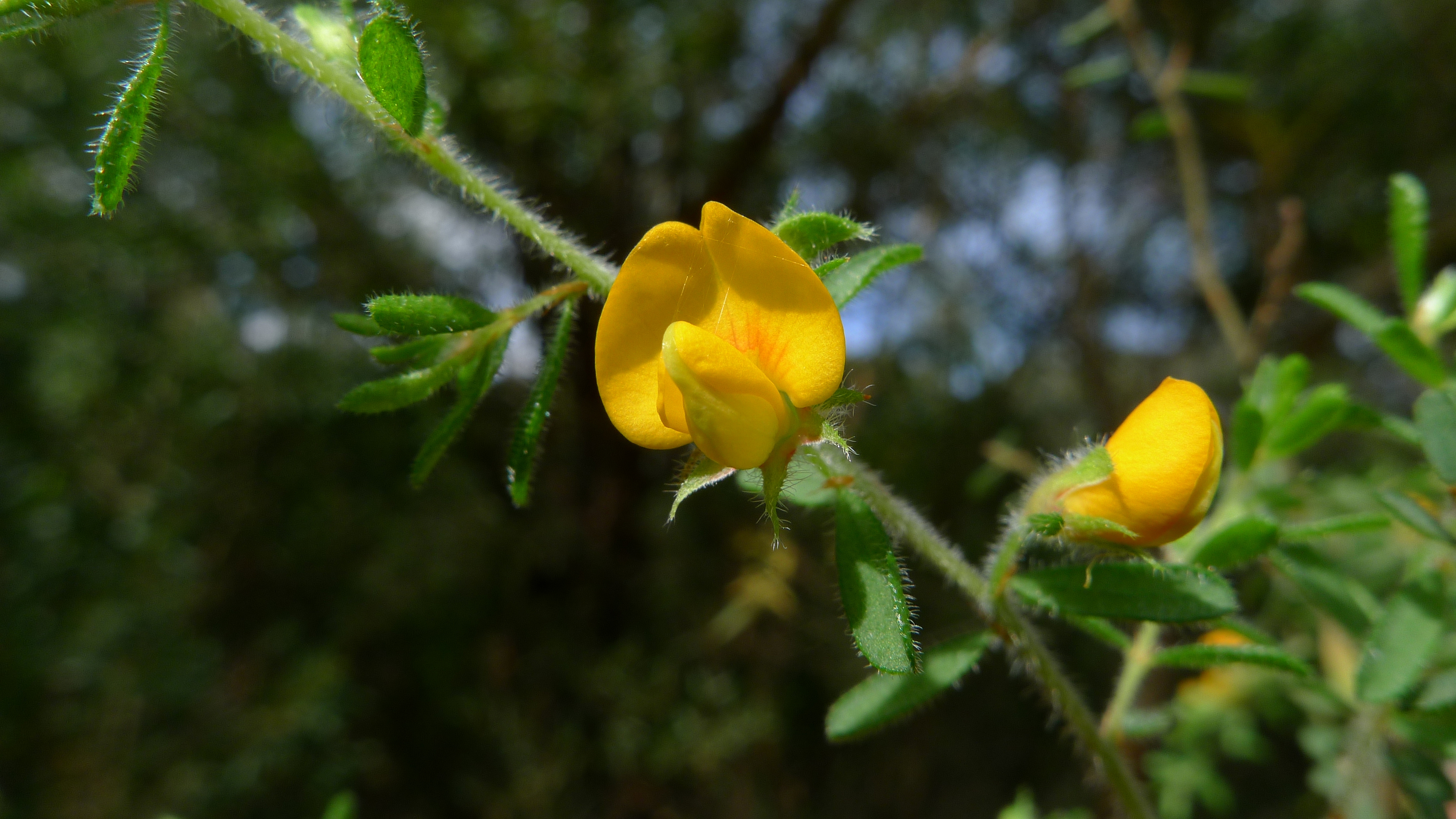
- In the Royal National Park

Scientific classification
- Kingdom: Plantae
- Clade: Tracheophytes
- Clade: Angiosperms
- Clade: Eudicots
- Clade: Rosids
- Order: Fabales
- Family: Fabaceae
- Subfamily: Faboideae
- Genus: Pultenaea
- Species: P. villosa

Binomial name
- Pultenaea villosa Willd.

Synonyms
- ? Pultenaea lanata A.Cunn. ex Benth.; Pultenaea racemulosa DC.; Pultenaea villosa var. lanata (A.Cunn. ex Benth.) Domin; Pultenaea villosa Willd. var. villosa

= Pultenaea villosa =

Hairy bush-pea

Species of legume

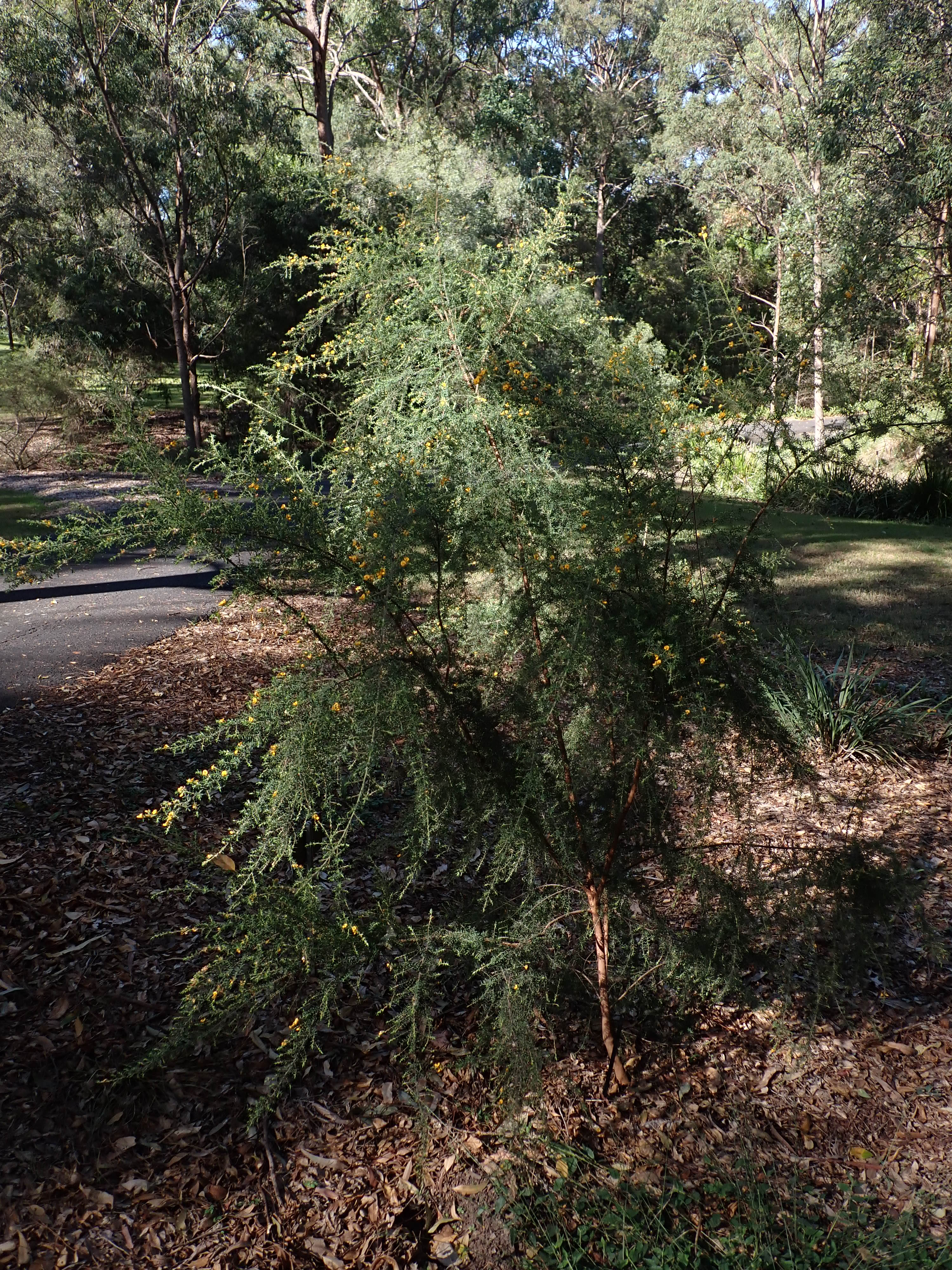
Habit in Mount Coot-tha Botanic Garden

Pultenaea villosa, commonly known as hairy bush-pea, is a species of flowering plant in the family Fabaceae and is endemic to eastern Australia. It is a shrub with softly-hairy foliage, narrow elliptic to linear, oblong to club-shaped leaves, and yellow-orange and reddish-brown, pea-like flowers.

== Description ==
Pultenaea villosa is an erect, sometimes prostrate shrub, that typically grows to 0.25–2.5 m (9.8 in – 8 ft 2.4 in) high and 3 m (9.8 ft) wide, with softly-hairy foliage and sometimes with weeping branches. The leaves are arranged alternately, narrow elliptic to linear, oblong to club-shaped, mostly 3–10 mm (0.12–0.39 in) long and 1.5–3.0 mm (0.059–0.118 in) wide with stipules 1–4 mm (0.039–0.157 in) long pressed against the stem at the base. The flowers are 5–12 mm (0.20–0.47 in) long, arranged in small groups near the ends of branches, each flower on a pedicel 1–4 mm (0.039–0.157 in) long. The sepals are 3.5–11 mm (0.14–0.43 in) long with bracteoles 3.4–5.3 mm (0.13–0.21 in) long usually attached to the sepal tube. The standard petal is yellow to orange with reddish brown lines and 8.2–10.3 mm (0.32–0.41 in) long, the wings yellow to orange and 8.2–9.2 mm (0.32–0.36 in) long, and the keel reddish-brown and 7.6–8.7 mm (0.30–0.34 in) long. Flowering mainly occurs from August to November and the fruit is an inflated pod 5–6 mm (0.20–0.24 in) long.

== Taxonomy ==
Pultenaea villosa was first formally described in 1799 by Carl Ludwig Willdenow in the fourth edition of the Species Plantarum. The specific epithet (villosa) means "with long, soft hairs".

== Distribution and habitat ==
Hairy bush-pea grows in forest, heathland grassland and coastal dunes in south-east Queensland and on the coast and Northern Tablelands of New South Wales.

== Use in horticulture ==
This "eggs and bacon" pea is one of the easier pultenaeas to grow in the garden. It can be propagated from seed or from cuttings and grown as a specimen plant or in informal hedges, preferring moist soil in a partly sunny position. The species is frost hardy and has "attractive" reddish new growth.
