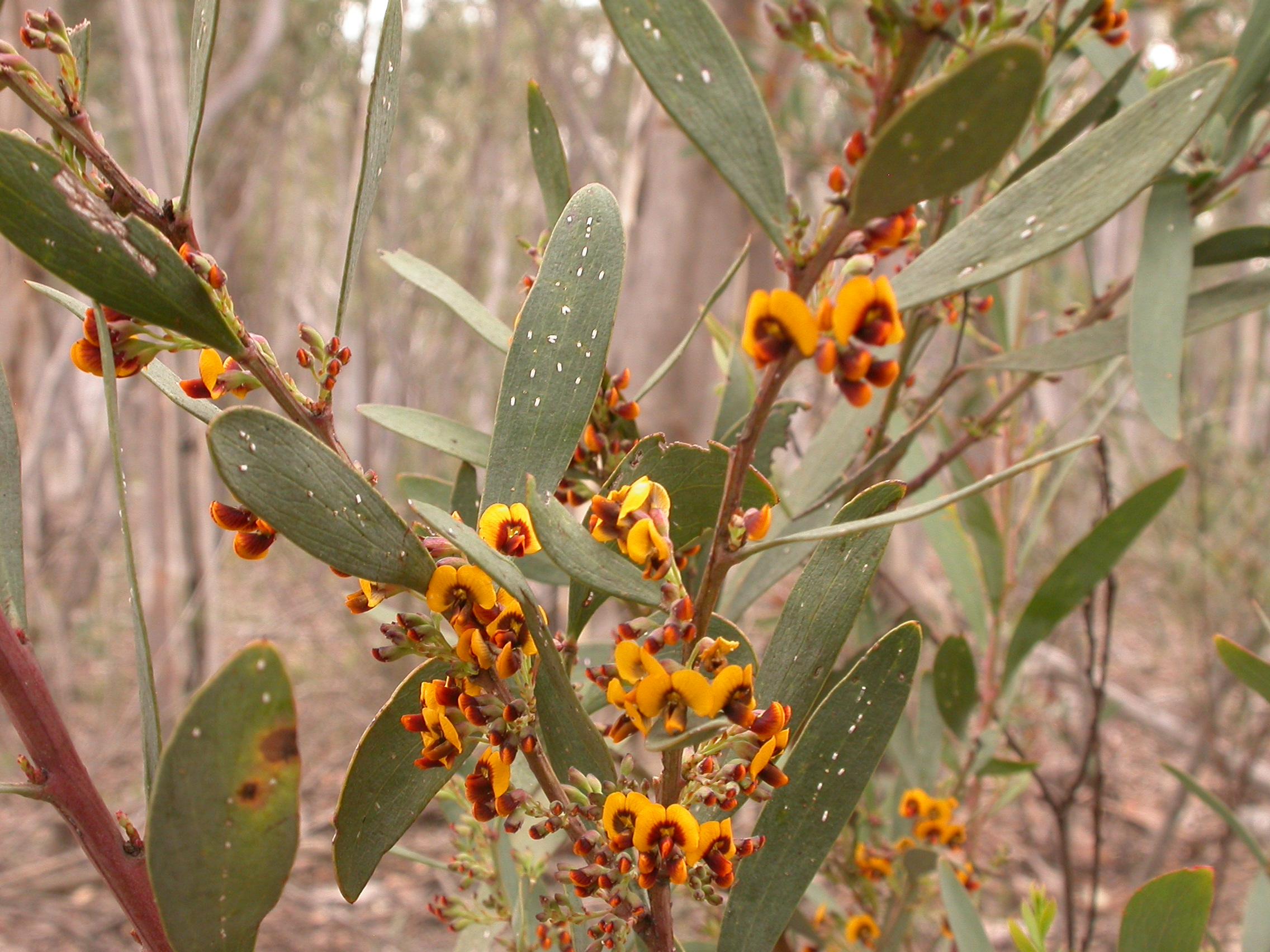
- Daviesia mimosoides on Black Mountain

Scientific classification
- Kingdom: Plantae
- Clade: Tracheophytes
- Clade: Angiosperms
- Clade: Eudicots
- Clade: Rosids
- Order: Fabales
- Family: Fabaceae
- Subfamily: Faboideae
- Genus: Daviesia
- Species: D. mimosoides

Binomial name
- Daviesia mimosoides R.Br.

Synonyms
- Daviesia corymbosa var. mimosoides (R.Br.) Benth.; Daviesia glauca Lodd., G.Lodd. & W.Lodd. nom. illeg., nom. superfl.; Daviesia laurifolia Link nom. inval., pro syn.; Daviesia mimosoides R.Br. var. mimosoides

= Daviesia mimosoides =

Blunt-leaf bitter-pea

Species of plant

Daviesia mimosoides, commonly known as blunt-leaf bitter-pea, narrow-leaf bitter pea or leafy bitter-pea, is a species of flowering plant in the family Fabaceae and is endemic to eastern continental Australia. It is an open shrub with tapering, linear, elliptic or egg-shaped phyllodes, and groups of orange-yellow and dark brownish-red to maroon flowers.

== Description ==
Daviesia mimosoides is an open shrub that typically grows to a height of up to 2 m (6 ft 7 in), rarely tree-like to 5 m (16 ft), and has many glabrous branches. The phyllodes are mostly narrowly elliptic, sometimes linear or egg-shaped with the narrower end towards the base, 15–200 mm (0.59–7.87 in) long and 4–30 mm (0.16–1.18 in) wide. The flowers are usually arranged in one or two racemes of five to ten flowers in leaf axils, on a peduncle 1–5 mm (0.039–0.197 in) long, the rachis 4–12 mm (0.16–0.47 in) long with narrowly oblong bracts at the base. The sepals are 2.5–5 mm (0.098–0.197 in) long and joined at the base, the upper two lobes joined for most of their length and the lower three triangular and 0.3–0.6 mm (0.012–0.024 in) long. The standard petal is broadly elliptic to egg-shaped, orange-yellow with dark brownish-red or maroon markings and a yellow centre and 6–7.5 mm (0.24–0.30 in) long. The wings are 5.0–6.75 mm (0.197–0.266 in) long and dark brownish-red or maroon with yellow tips, and the keel is 4.0–4.5 mm (0.16–0.18 in) long and maroon. Flowering mainly occurs in September and October and the fruit is a flattened, triangular pod 6–10 mm (0.24–0.39 in) long.

== Taxonomy ==
Daviesia mimosoides was first formally described in 1811 by Robert Brown in Aiton's Hortus Kewensis. The specific epithet (mimosoides) means "Mimosa-like".

In 1991, Michael Crisp described two subspecies, and the names are accepted by the Australian Plant Census:

- Daviesia mimosoides subsp. acris Crisp has slightly glaucous leaves with a wedge-shaped base;
- Daviesia mimosoides R.Br. subsp. mimosoides has dull green leaves that are narrower than those of subspecies acris and have a tapering base.

== Distribution and habitat ==
Blunt-leaf bitter-pea grows in the understorey of open forest from south-east Queensland, through eastern New South Wales and the Australian Capital Territory, to eastern Victoria, at altitudes from sea level to 1,500 m (4,900 ft). Subspecies acris is restricted to exposed rocky peaks from the Brindabella Range in the Australian Capital Territory, through southern New South Wales to eastern Victoria, at altitudes above 1,200 m (3,900 ft).
