= Incrassata =

Incrassata may refer to:

- Metepeira incrassata
- Ascidia incrassata
- Eucalyptus incrassata
- Tritia incrassata
- Hakea incrassata
- Caladenia incrassata
- Acacia incrassata
- Meruliporia incrassata
- Struthiolaria incrassata
- Crassispira incrassata
- Anthemis incrassata
- Hoya incrassata
- Cladonia incrassata
- Oliva incrassata
- Draba incrassata
- Daviesia incrassata
- Syritta incrassata
- Plusia incrassata
- Antaeotricha incrassata
- Serruria incrassata
- Dimorphotheca incrassata
- Cleiothyridina incrassata
- Navia incrassata
- Hyoseris incrassata
- Grevillea incrassata
- Millepora incrassata
- Archelix abrolena var. incrassata
- Cutandia incrassata
