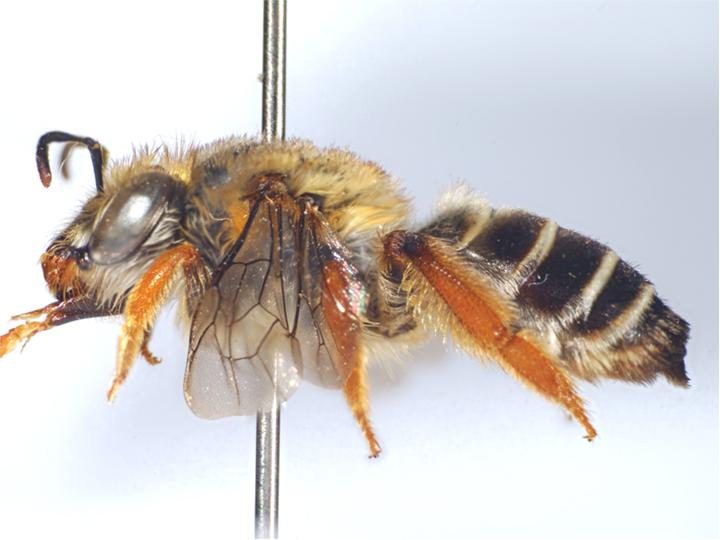
- Female

Scientific classification
- Kingdom: Animalia
- Phylum: Arthropoda
- Clade: Pancrustacea
- Class: Insecta
- Order: Hymenoptera
- Family: Colletidae
- Genus: Trichocolletes
- Species: T. dowerinensis

Binomial name
- Trichocolletes dowerinensis Rayment, 1931

= Trichocolletes dowerinensis =

Species of bee

Trichocolletes dowerinensis is a species of bee in the family Colletidae and the subfamily Colletinae. It is endemic to Australia. It was described in 1931 by Australian entomologist Tarlton Rayment.

== Description ==
The female body length is about 13 mm, the male 12 mm. The eyes are hairy. Colouration is mainly black, with broad silver metasomal bands.

== Distribution and habitat ==
The species occurs in south-west Western Australia. The type locality is Dowerin, Western Australia in the Wheatbelt.

== Behaviour ==
The adults are flying mellivores. Flowering plants visited by the bees include Gompholobium hendersonii, Daviesia aphylla, Daviesia croniniana, Daviesia incrassata, Jacksonia velutina, Gastrolobium glaucum, Gastrolobium ilicifolium, Swainsona microphylla and Pultenaea species.

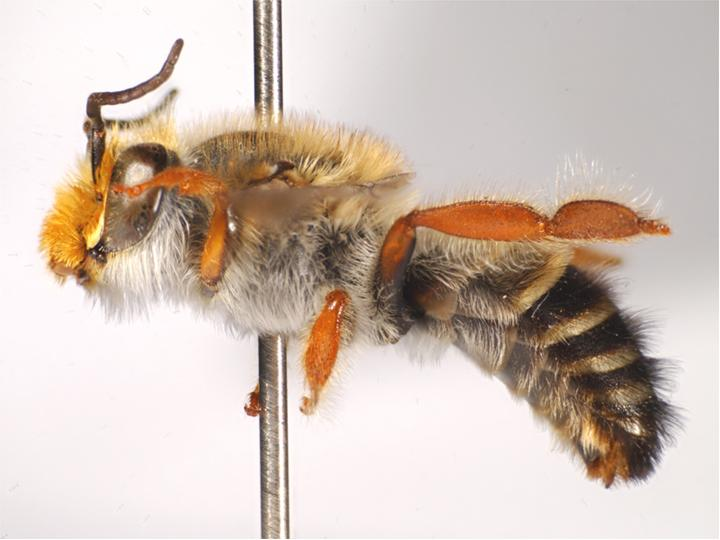
Male
