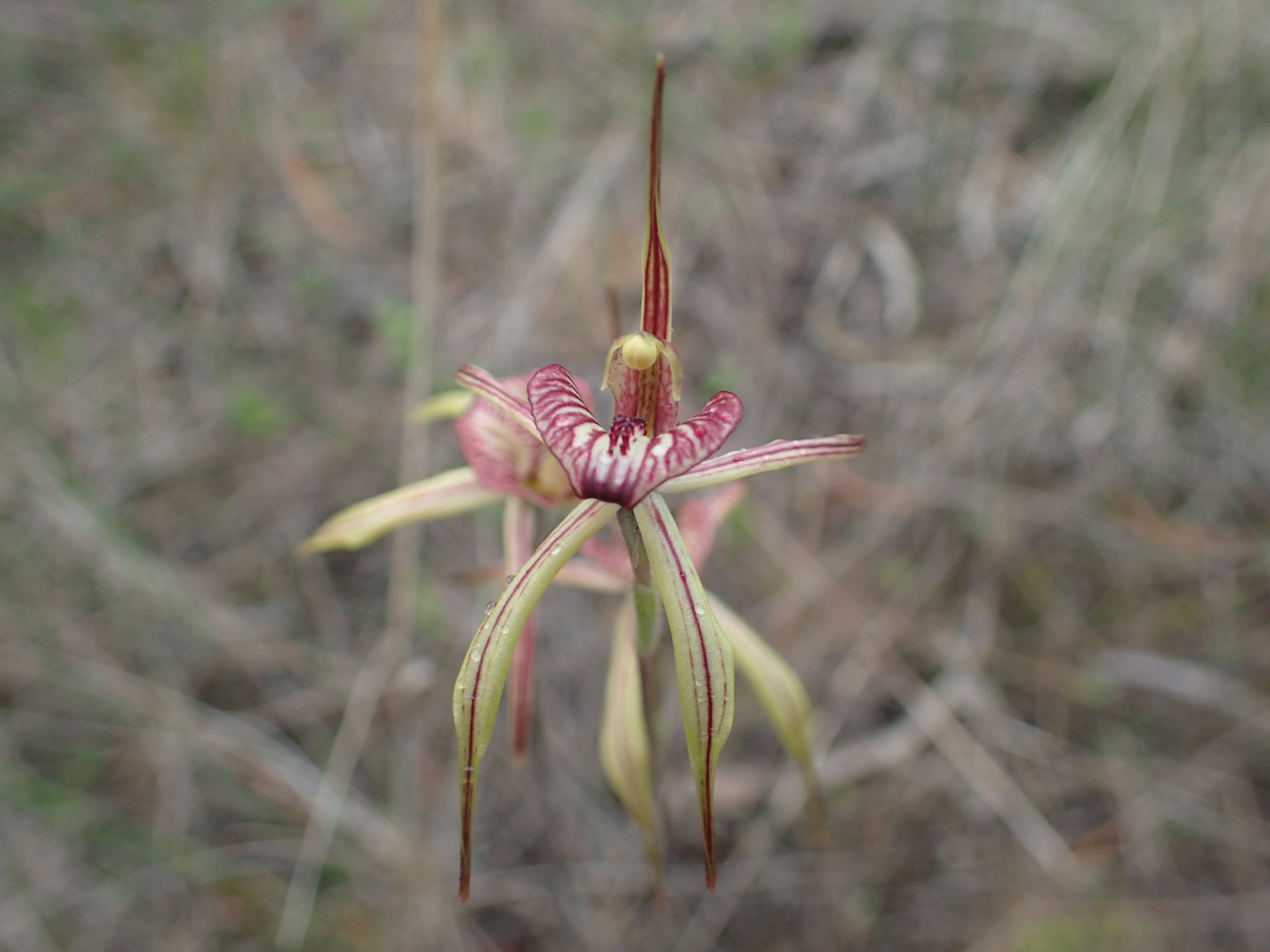
- Near Beverley

Scientific classification
- Kingdom: Plantae
- Clade: Embryophytes
- Clade: Tracheophytes
- Clade: Spermatophytes
- Clade: Angiosperms
- Clade: Monocots
- Order: Asparagales
- Family: Orchidaceae
- Subfamily: Orchidoideae
- Tribe: Diurideae
- Genus: Caladenia
- Species: C. doutchiae

Binomial name
- Caladenia doutchiae O.H.Sarg.

Synonyms
- Calonema doutchiae (O.H.Sarg.) D.L.Jones & M.A.Clem.; Phlebochilus doutchiae (O.H.Sarg.) Szlach.; Jonesiopsis doutchiae (O.H.Sarg.) D.L.Jones & M.A.Clem.

= Caladenia doutchiae =

Purple-veined spider orchid

Species of orchid

Caladenia doutchiae, commonly known as the purple-veined clown orchid or purple-veined spider orchid is a species of orchid endemic to the south-west of Western Australia. It has a single hairy leaf and usually only one greenish-yellow and red flower with short, downswept petals, and lateral sepals that are broad at the base then narrow to a glandular tip.

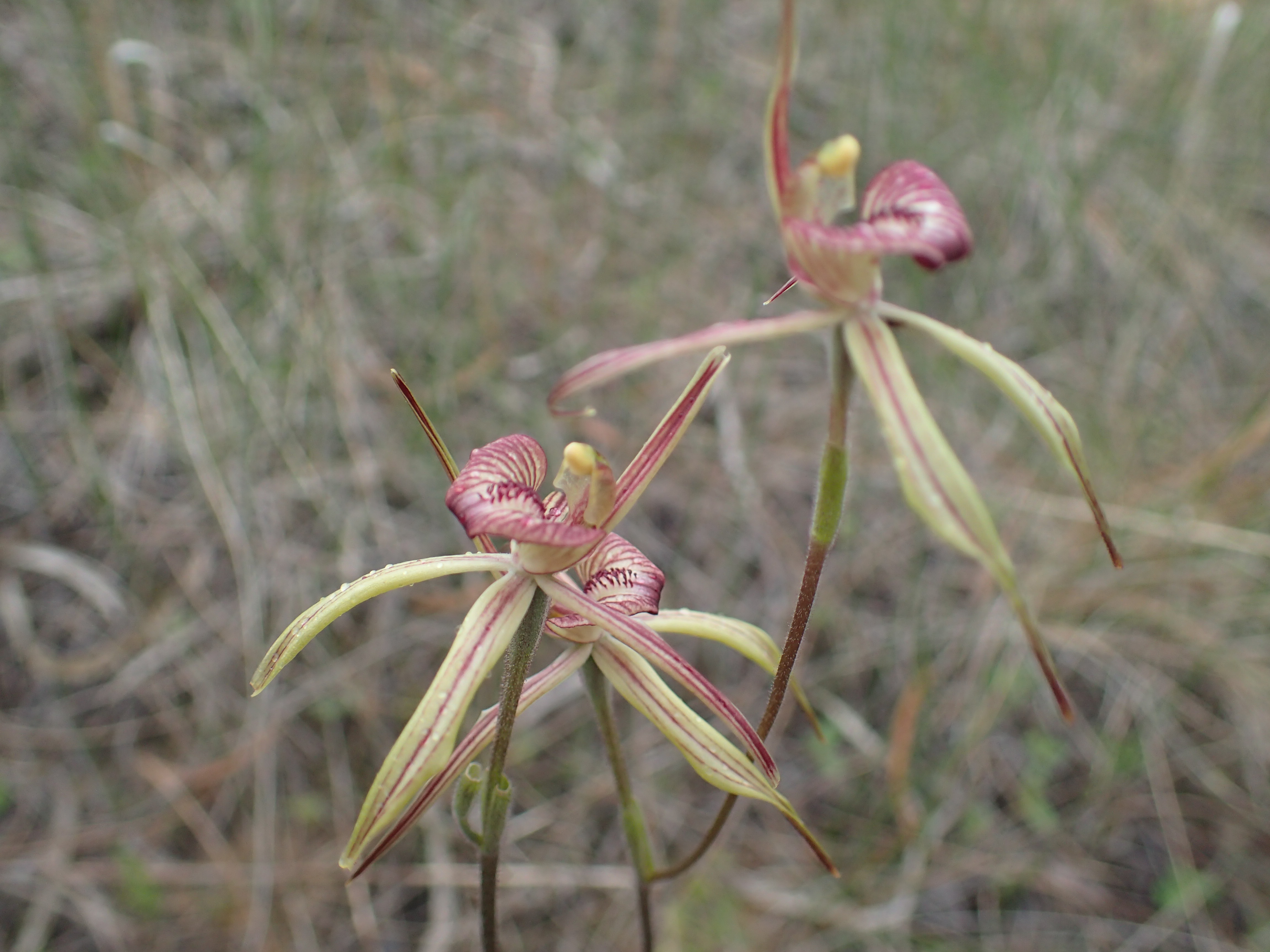
Habit

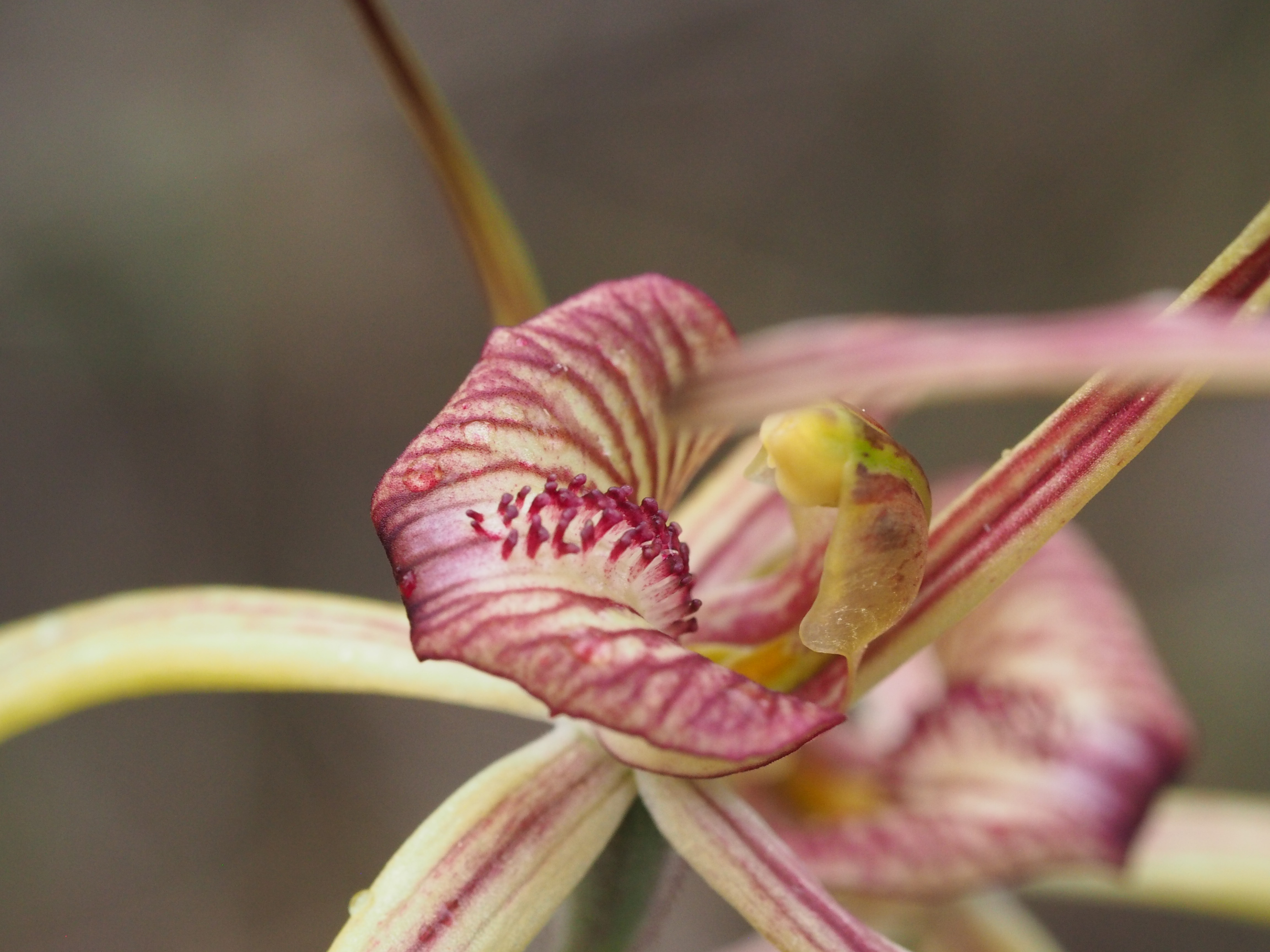
Labellum detail

== Description ==
Caladenia doutchiae is a terrestrial, perennial, deciduous, herb with an underground tuber and a single, erect, narrow linear, hairy leaf, 5–15 cm (2–6 in) long and 4–6 mm (0.16–0.24 in) wide. Usually only one greenish yellow and red flower, 3–5 cm (1–2 in) long and 1–3 cm (0.4–1 in) wide is borne on a stalk 5–30 cm (2–10 in) tall. The petals are downswept and relatively short whilst the lateral sepals are relatively wide near the base but narrow to a thread-like end covered with reddish glandular hairs. The labellum is greenish-yellow with red markings, a red tip and smooth edges. There is a dense, narrow band of short, red-tipped calli along the centre line of the labellum. Flowering occurs from August to October. This species is similar to the short sepalled spider orchid C. brevisura and the puppet orchid C. incrassata but is distinguished from them by its longer sepals and narrower band of calli.

== Taxonomy and naming ==
Caladenia doutchiae was first formally described by Oswald Sargent in 1921 from a specimen collected by Leila Doutch, the headmistress of the small school at Datatine in the Shire of Dumbleyung, who collected the type specimen near the school. The description was published in Journal of Botany, British and Foreign. The specific epithet (doutchiae) honours the collector of the type specimen.

== Distribution and habitat ==
The purple-veined spider orchid occurs between Geraldton and Ravensthorpe growing in woodland, shrubland and heath in the Avon Wheatbelt, Coolgardie, Esperance Plains, Geraldton Sandplains, Mallee, Swan Coastal Plain and Yalgoo biogeographic regions.

== Conservation ==
Caladenia doutchiae is classified as "not threatened" by the Government of Western Australia Department of Parks and Wildlife.
