= Syritta indica =

Scientific classification
- Kingdom: Animalia
- Phylum: Arthropoda
- Clade: Pancrustacea
- Class: Insecta
- Order: Diptera
- Family: Syrphidae
- Subfamily: Eristalinae
- Tribe: Milesiini
- Genus: Syritta
- Species: S. indica

Binomial name
- Syritta indica (Wiedemann, 1824)

Synonyms
- Eumerus indica Wiedemann, 1824; Syritta rufifacies Bigot, 1884; Syritta femorata Sack, 1913

Species of fly

Syritta indica is a species of syrphid fly in the family Syrphidae.

== Distribution ==
Taiwan, Nepal, India.
