= Syritta oceanica =

Scientific classification
- Kingdom: Animalia
- Phylum: Arthropoda
- Clade: Pancrustacea
- Class: Insecta
- Order: Diptera
- Family: Syrphidae
- Subfamily: Eristalinae
- Tribe: Milesiini
- Genus: Syritta
- Species: S. oceanica

Binomial name
- Syritta oceanica Macquart, 1855

Synonyms
- Syritta occanica Macquart, 1855

Species of fly

Syritta oceanica is a species of syrphid fly in the family Syrphidae.

== Distribution ==
Hawaii, Cook Islands, Society Islands, Marquesas Islands.
