= Syritta orientalis =

Scientific classification
- Kingdom: Animalia
- Phylum: Arthropoda
- Clade: Pancrustacea
- Class: Insecta
- Order: Diptera
- Family: Syrphidae
- Subfamily: Eristalinae
- Tribe: Milesiini
- Genus: Syritta
- Species: S. orientalis

Binomial name
- Syritta orientalis Macquart, 1842

Synonyms
- Syritta illucida Walker, 1859; Senogaster lutescens Doleschall, 1856; Spheginobaccha christiani Sodhi & Singh, 1991; Syritta amboinensis Doleschall, 1858

Species of fly

Syritta orientalis is a species of syrphid fly in the family Syrphidae.

== Distribution ==
Oriental region, Australia, Micronesia, Hawaii.
