= Dry rot =

Fungal wood decay

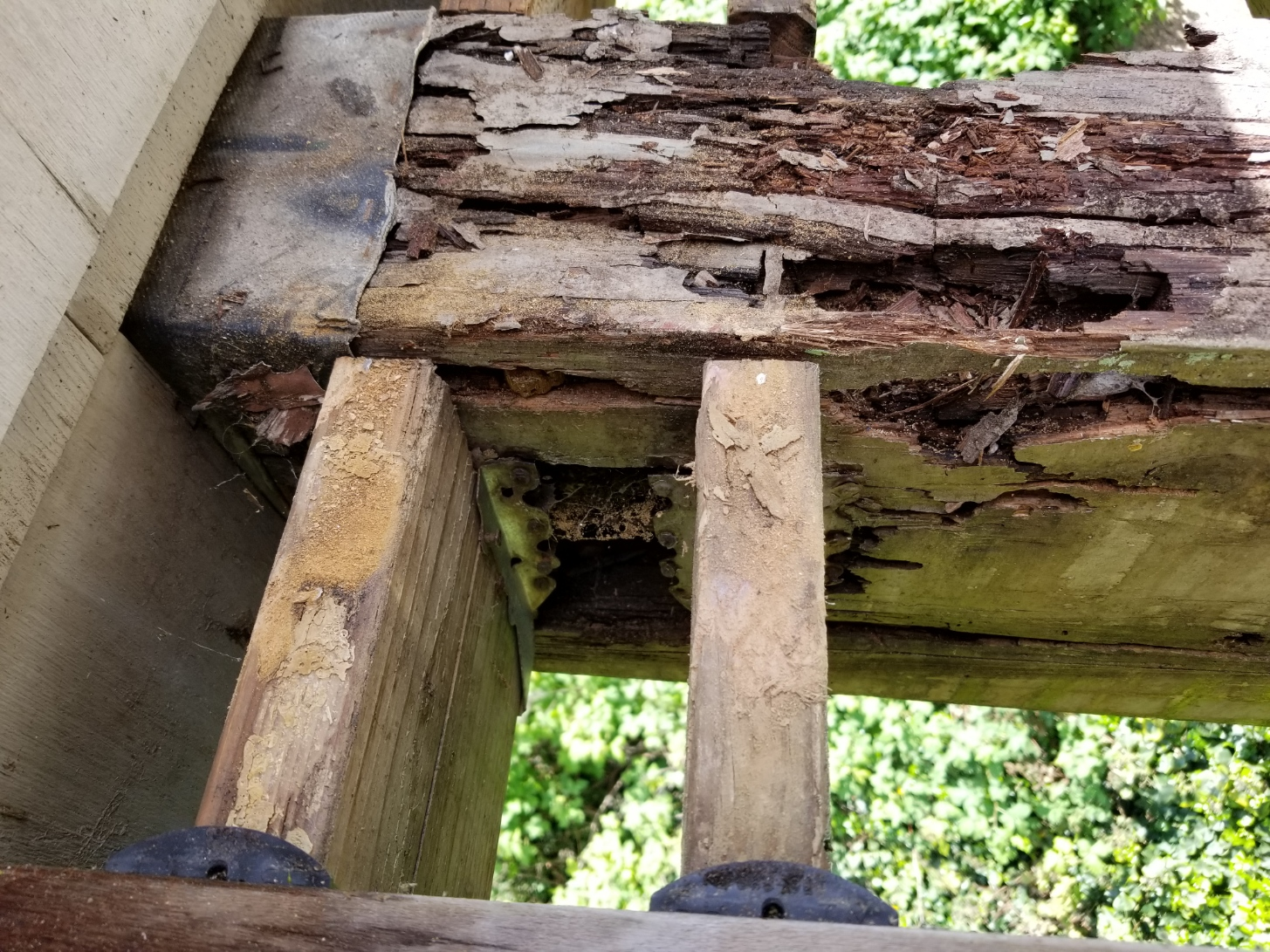
Deck beam dry rot

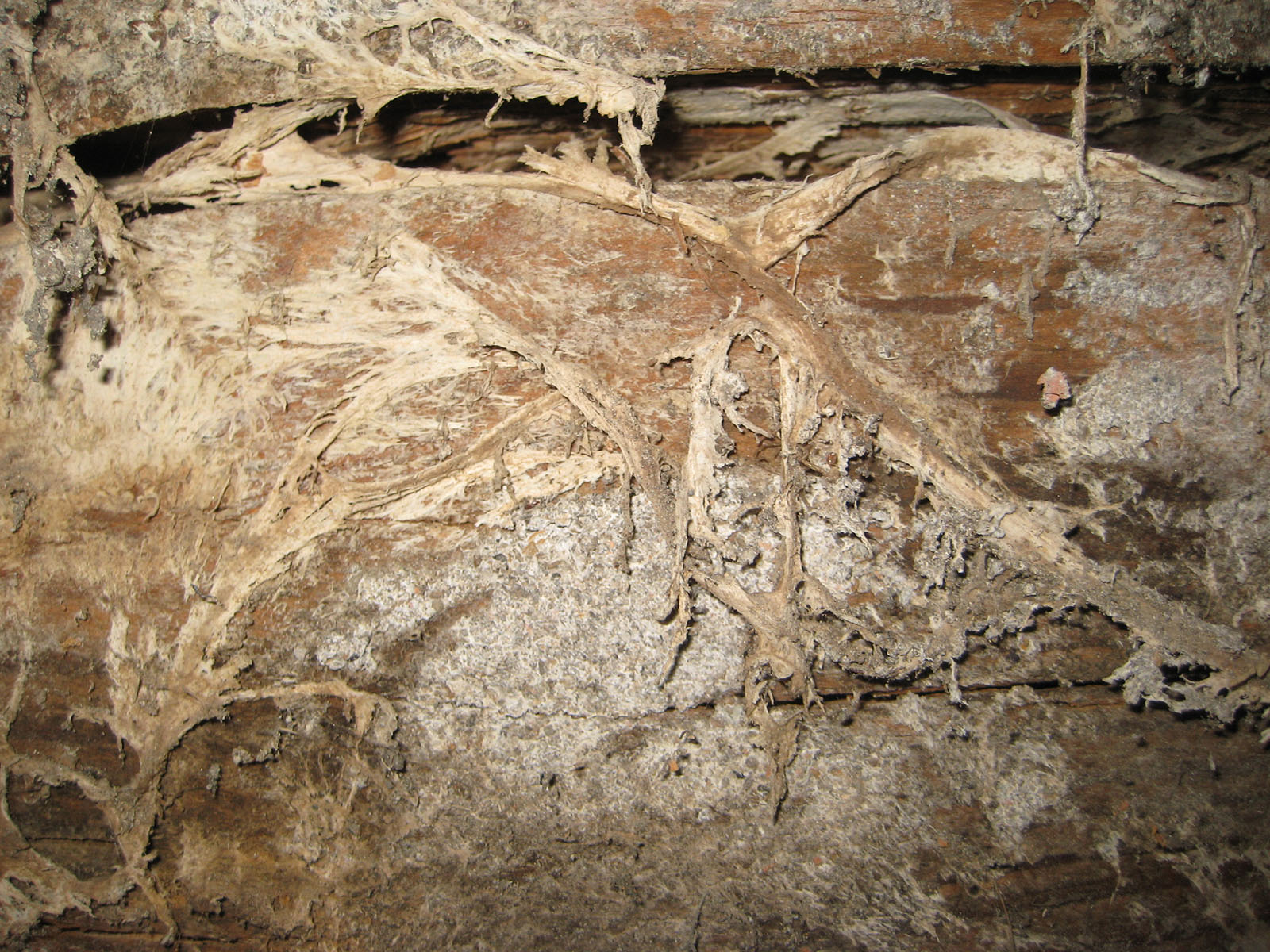
Wooden beam with significant fungal growth

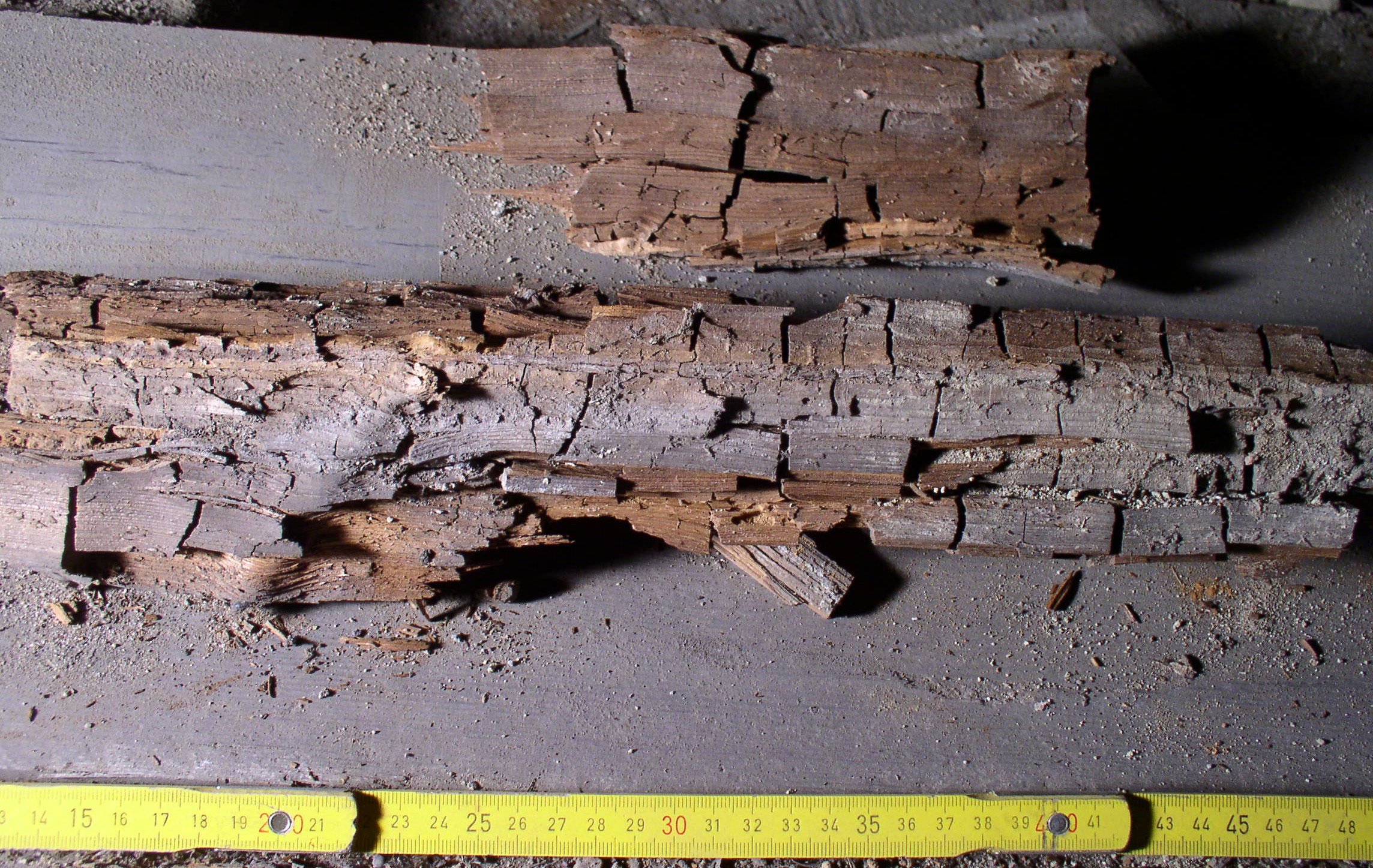
Wood decay caused by the brown rot fungus Serpula lacrymans (true dry rot)

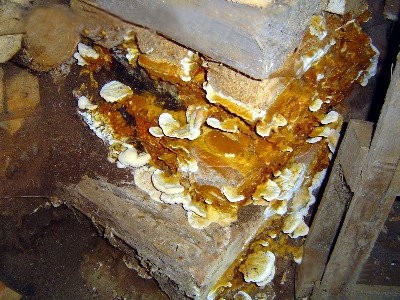
Damaged wall with fungal growth

Dry rot is wood decay caused by one of several species of fungi that digest parts of wood which give it strength and stiffness. It was previously used to describe any decay of cured wood in ships and buildings by a fungus which resulted in a darkly colored deteriorated and cracked condition.

The life-cycle of dry rot can be broken down into four main stages. Dry rot begins as a microscopic spore which, in high enough concentrations, can resemble a fine orange dust. If the spores are subjected to sufficient moisture, they will germinate and begin to grow fine white strands known as hyphae. As the hyphae grow they will eventually form a large mass known as mycelium. The final stage is a fruiting body which pumps new spores out into the surrounding air.

In other fields, the term has been applied to the decay of crop plants by fungi. In health and safety, the term is used to describe the deterioration of rubber, for example the cracking of rubber hoses.

== Discussion ==
Dry rot is the term given to brown rot decay caused by certain fungi that deteriorate timber in buildings and other wooden construction without an apparent source of moisture. The term is a misnomer because all wood decaying fungi need a minimum amount of moisture before decay begins. The decayed wood takes on a dark or browner crumbly appearance, with cubical like cracking or checking, that becomes brittle and can eventually crush the wood into powder. Chemically, wood attacked by dry rot fungi is decayed by the same process as other brown rot fungi. An outbreak of dry rot within a building can be an extremely serious infestation that is hard to eradicate, requiring drastic remedies to correct. Significant decay can cause instability and cause the structure to collapse.

The term dry rot, or true dry rot, refers to the decay of timbers from only certain species of fungi that are thought to provide their own source of moisture and nutrients to cause decay in otherwise relatively dry timber. However, there has been no published experimental evidence to support the phenomenon. In modern texts, the term 'dry rot' is used in reference to damage inflicted by either: Serpula lacrymans (formerly Merulius lacrymans) predominantly in the United Kingdom and northern Europe; and/or Meruliporia incrassata (which has a number of synonyms, including Poria incrassata and Serpula incrassata) in North America. Both species of fungi cause brown rot decay, preferentially removing cellulose and hemicellulose from the timber, leaving a brittle matrix of modified lignin.

The term dry rot is somewhat misleading, as both species of fungi Serpula lacrymans and Meruliporia incrassata require an elevated moisture content to initiate an attack on timber (28–30%). Once established, the fungi can remain active in timber with a moisture content of more than 20%. At relative humidities below 86 percent, growth of Serpula lacrymans is inhibited, but it can stay dormant at relative humidities down to 76 percent. These relative humidities correspond to equilibrium moisture contents of wood of 19 and 15 percent, respectively. It is to be remembered that most forms of rot cannot be stopped.

An explanation of the term "dry rot" circles around boatyards periodically. In the age of wooden ships, boats were sometimes hauled for the winter and placed in sheds or dry dock for repair. The boats already had some amount of rot occurring in the wood members, but the wood cellular structure was full of water making it still function structurally. As the wood dried out, the cell walls would crumble. In other words, the wood was already rotten and as the boat dried, the wood collapsed and crumbled, causing the workers in the yard to determine it was "dry rot", when in fact, the wood had been rotten all along.

Schilling & Jellison note the potential efficiency of these 'dry rot' fungi in growing away from direct moisture sources, although there is no reference for how efficient a brown rot fungus has to be at translocating water in order to be classed as 'dry rot'. Some have suggested the importance of these fungi providing their own source of nutrients as being more significant than providing an adequate source of moisture. Schilling suggests efficient nutrient translocation and utilization, notably nitrogen and iron, may be more distinctive in these species than water translocation. Water translocated in this fashion carries nutrients to the extremities of the organism; not, as is sometimes inferred, to simply render dry timber wet enough to attack. Coggins goes into more detail about water movement in Serpula lacrymans.

The perpetual saturation of wood with water also inhibits dry rot, as does perpetual dryness.

Dry rot would appear to be a paradoxical term seemingly indicating decay of a substance by a fungus without the presence of water. However, its historical usage dates back to the distinction between decay of cured wood in construction, i.e. dry wood, versus decay of wood in living or newly felled trees, i.e. wet wood.

== Historical use of the term "dry rot" ==
'Dry rot' is an 18th-century term that generally described what is now called brown rot. The term was used because the damage was present in cured or dried timber of ships and buildings and was thought to be caused by internal ‘fermentations’ rather than water. This contributes to the etymological fallacy that dry rot requires less or no water than other species that use the brown rot decay mechanism.

The (London) Times on Tuesday 12 March 1793 carried an advertisement that informs the reader that the "British Colour Company, No. 32, Walbrook, London continues to use, manufacture and sell paints prepared with the Oil of Coal, which is of a very penetrating nature, and hardens wood in an uncommon degree protecting it from weather, dry rot and ice".

In the early 19th century the rapid increase in instances of timber decay attributed to dry rot (brown rot) in the British naval fleet brought the term into wider usage. Thomas Wade's 'A Treatise on the Dry Rot in Timber' was published posthumously by the Navy Office in 1815 following his investigation of the matter in ships from various countries. The second HMS Queen Charlotte was launched in 1810 and, when inspected, the timbers of the upper decks were found to be infected with 'the dry rot'. By 1816 the cost of repairs for this vessel had exceeded the ship's original construction cost.

Texts published in the 19th and early 20th centuries also used the term to describe fungi which produced substantial (white-colored) mycelium, including Antrodia (Fibroporia) vaillantii.

Eventually, the term dry rot came to apply to only one or two fungi the main one being Serpula lacrymans, in the majority of texts dealing with the subject, predominantly from the United Kingdom. This type of fungal decay subsequently also became known as 'true dry rot'. It has even been proposed to use the term water-conducting fungi in the category of brown rot rather than dry rot. However, although the fungi such as these can transport water, it is disputed that it can use this water to increase the moisture content of otherwise dry wood. Whilst it may be disputed as the citation notes, the epithet 'lacrymans' is derived from the Latin word 'lacrimare', meaning 'to weep' and most surveyors of rotted buildings have noted the tear drops formed by the fungus as water forms on the hyphae. These water droplets are photographed in Rentokil's book "Decay of Timber in Buildings" Figure 24. There is, however, no evidence these small amounts of water on the hyphae cause a significant increase in the moisture content of otherwise dry wood.

== Treatment of dry rot timber ==
Dry rot can be very difficult to remediate unless the timber is dried. In some cases after this is done, decayed areas can be treated with special epoxy formulations that fill-in the channels of the damaged wood, killing the rot and improving structural integrity. However, this type of treatment can actually promote decay in wood in exterior service unless the epoxy application is designed to shed water. Epoxy or other polymers will trap moisture behind the patch, causing more decay in the surrounding previously uninfected zones unless the repaired zone is protected from recurring water events. Commercial ethylene glycol (commonly sold as antifreeze) and many other toxic diffusible compounds can diffuse into the wood to kill the fungus, but they also can diffuse out of wood that is repeatedly wetted. Diffusion of these toxic compounds out of the wood, and into surrounding soils and plants is not appropriate from a toxicity or environmental standpoint, and these types of treatment are not recommended for wood in-service. Certain copper compounds, such as copper naphthenate, are available as a brushable solution and are frequently used when dry-rot damage is repaired by splicing in new wood; after removal of bulk rotten wood the remaining original surface is saturated with such a compound (typically green in color) before application of the new wood.

In certain buildings, particularly those with solid 9 inch (or greater) brickwork and those built using lime mortar and flintstone, dry rot has been known to travel through and along the wall surface behind plaster and render. It is therefore recommended, by companies that sell this service, that where dry rot is found, plaster and wall coverings should be stripped back to a metre past the infestation in all directions and the whole area treated. However, given that dry rot attacks only wet timber, common sense should dictate that plaster need not be removed where there is no timber or any timber is dry (outside the zone of wetting that caused the outbreak). Identifying the source of water and allowing the affected timbers to dry will kill dry rot, as it is a fungus and requires water as all fungi do. This will not, however, kill any spores left behind, which will remain viable and cause the rot to return upon wetting.

== See also ==
- Mold health issues
- Wet rot
- Wood-decay fungus
