= Syritta maritima =

Scientific classification
- Kingdom: Animalia
- Phylum: Arthropoda
- Clade: Pancrustacea
- Class: Insecta
- Order: Diptera
- Family: Syrphidae
- Subfamily: Eristalinae
- Tribe: Milesiini
- Genus: Syritta
- Species: S. maritima

Binomial name
- Syritta maritima Hull, 1944

Species of fly

Syritta maritima is a species of syrphid fly in the family Syrphidae.

== Distribution ==
Christmas Island.
