= Syritta stylata =

Scientific classification
- Kingdom: Animalia
- Phylum: Arthropoda
- Clade: Pancrustacea
- Class: Insecta
- Order: Diptera
- Family: Syrphidae
- Subfamily: Eristalinae
- Tribe: Milesiini
- Genus: Syritta
- Species: S. stylata

Binomial name
- Syritta stylata Lyneborg & Barkemeyer, 2005

Species of fly

Syritta stylata is a species of syrphid fly in the family Syrphidae.

== Distribution ==
India.
