= Syritta stigmatica =

Scientific classification
- Kingdom: Animalia
- Phylum: Arthropoda
- Clade: Pancrustacea
- Class: Insecta
- Order: Diptera
- Family: Syrphidae
- Subfamily: Eristalinae
- Tribe: Milesiini
- Genus: Syritta
- Species: S. stigmatica

Binomial name
- Syritta stigmatica Loew, 1858

Synonyms
- Syritta pleuritica Speiser, 1910

Species of fly

Syritta stigmatica is a species of syrphid fly in the family Syrphidae.

== Distribution ==
Ethiopia, Kenya, Mozambique, Nigeria.
