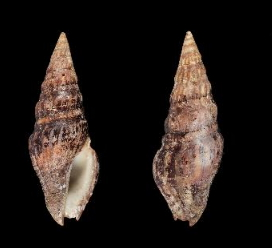
- Shell of Crassispira bottae (holotype in MNHN, Paris)

Scientific classification
- Kingdom: Animalia
- Phylum: Mollusca
- Class: Gastropoda
- Subclass: Caenogastropoda
- Order: Neogastropoda
- Superfamily: Conoidea
- Family: Pseudomelatomidae
- Genus: Crassispira
- Species: C. bottae

Binomial name
- Crassispira bottae (Valenciennes in Kiener, 1839)

Synonyms
- Drillia bottae (Valenciennes in Kiener, 1839); Pleurotoma bottae Valenciennes in Kiener, 1839 (original combination)

= Crassispira bottae =

Species of gastropod

Crassispira bottae is a species of sea snail, a marine gastropod mollusk in the family Pseudomelatomidae.

ITIS considers this species a synonym of Crassispira incrassata (Sowerby I, 1834) McLean confirmed that Pleurotoma bottae was a synonym of Crassispira incrassata The radula and the morphology was studied by Kantor et al. in 1997

== Description ==
The length of the shell varies between 35 mm and 50 mm.

The ponderous shell is dark chestnut or chocolate. The shell shows a slight shoulder-angle, above which the whorls are slightly concave to a sutural band. Below the shoulder the shell shows close rude longitudinal ribs, sometimes decussated into nodules by the raised revolving lines. Towards the base of the body whorl the latter remain prominent, whilst the former have vanished.

== Distribution ==
This marine species occurs off the Sea of Cortez, Western Mexico to Ecuador
