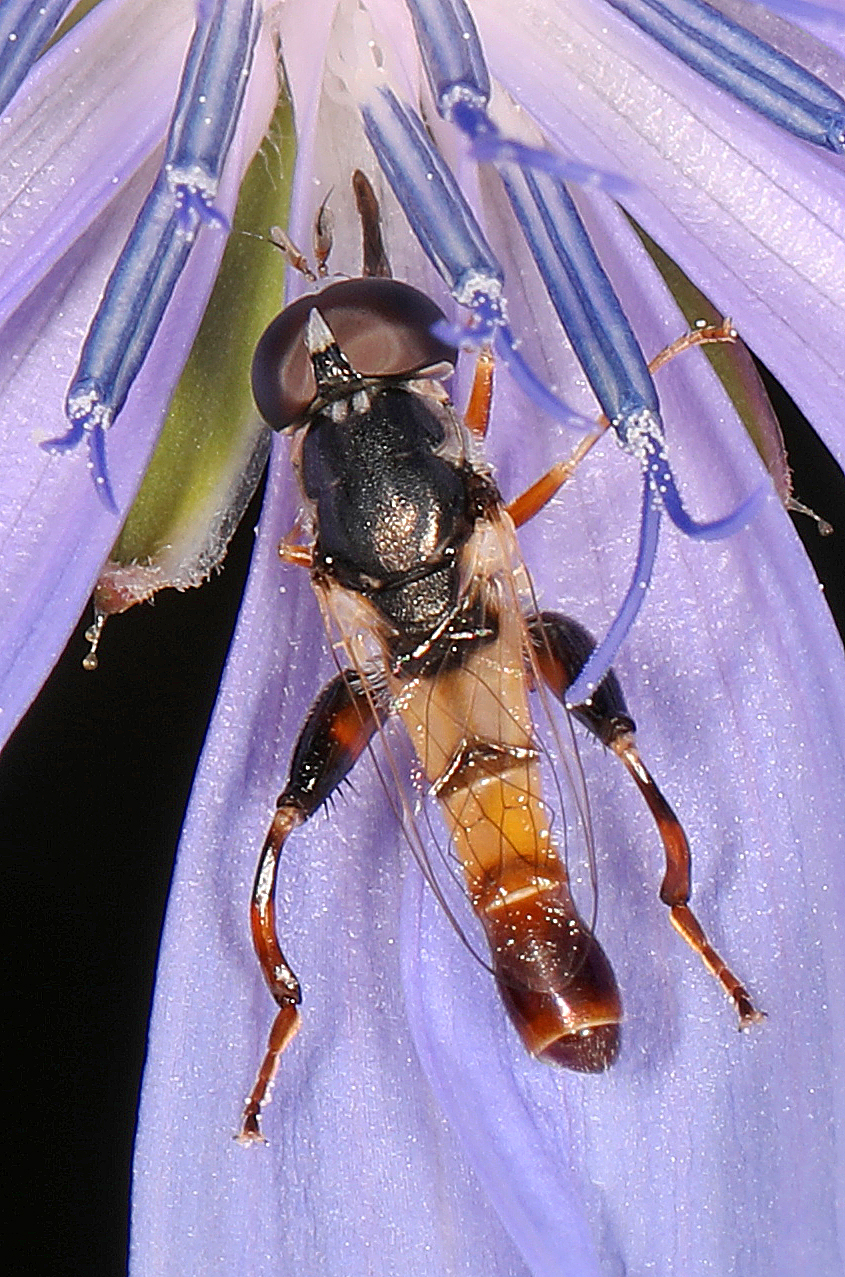

Scientific classification
- Kingdom: Animalia
- Phylum: Arthropoda
- Clade: Pancrustacea
- Class: Insecta
- Order: Diptera
- Family: Syrphidae
- Subfamily: Eristalinae
- Tribe: Milesiini
- Genus: Syritta
- Species: S. flaviventris

Binomial name
- Syritta flaviventris Macquart, 1842

Synonyms
- Syritta nigricornis Macquart, 1842; Syritta spinigera Loew, 1848; Syritta albifacies Bigot, 1859; Syritta aculeipes Schiner, 1868; Syritta armipes Thomson, 1869; Syritta spinigerella Thomson, 1869; Austrosyritta cortesi Marnef, 1967

= Syritta flaviventris =

Species of fly

Syritta flaviventris is a species of syrphid fly in the family Syrphidae.

== Distribution ==
Madagascar, southern Europe. Introduced to Chile, Brazil, United States, Mexico.
