= Syritta cerca =

Scientific classification
- Kingdom: Animalia
- Phylum: Arthropoda
- Clade: Pancrustacea
- Class: Insecta
- Order: Diptera
- Family: Syrphidae
- Subfamily: Eristalinae
- Tribe: Milesiini
- Genus: Syritta
- Species: S. cerca

Binomial name
- Syritta cerca Lyneborg & Barkemeyer, 2005

Species of fly

Syritta cerca is a species of syrphid fly in the family Syrphidae.

== Distribution ==
Congo.
