= Syritta lyneborgi =

Scientific classification
- Kingdom: Animalia
- Phylum: Arthropoda
- Clade: Pancrustacea
- Class: Insecta
- Order: Diptera
- Family: Syrphidae
- Subfamily: Eristalinae
- Tribe: Milesiini
- Genus: Syritta
- Species: S. lyneborgi

Binomial name
- Syritta lyneborgi Steenis, 2010

Species of fly

Syritta lyneborgi is a species of hoverfly (family Syrphidae).

== Distribution ==
Syritta lyneborgi is present in Gabon.
