= Syritta leona =

Scientific classification
- Kingdom: Animalia
- Phylum: Arthropoda
- Clade: Pancrustacea
- Class: Insecta
- Order: Diptera
- Family: Syrphidae
- Subfamily: Eristalinae
- Tribe: Milesiini
- Genus: Syritta
- Species: S. leona

Binomial name
- Syritta leona Lyneborg & Barkemeyer, 2005

Species of fly

Syritta leona is a species of syrphid fly in the family Syrphidae.

== Distribution ==
Angola, Burundi, Cameroon, the Congo (the Republic of the Congo and DRC), the Gambia, Ghana, Nigeria, Sierra Leone, South Africa, Uganda, Zambia.
