= Syritta fasciata =

Scientific classification
- Kingdom: Animalia
- Phylum: Arthropoda
- Clade: Pancrustacea
- Class: Insecta
- Order: Diptera
- Family: Syrphidae
- Subfamily: Eristalinae
- Tribe: Milesiini
- Genus: Syritta
- Species: S. fasciata

Binomial name
- Syritta fasciata (Wiedemann, 1830)

Synonyms
- Xylota fasciata Wiedemann, 1830; Syritta abyssinica Rondani, 1873; Syritta subtilis Becker, 1903

Species of fly

Syritta fasciata is a species of syrphid fly in the family Syrphidae.

== Distribution ==
Aldabra, Ethiopia, Guinea-Bissau, Kenya.
