= Syritta latitarsata =

Scientific classification
- Kingdom: Animalia
- Phylum: Arthropoda
- Clade: Pancrustacea
- Class: Insecta
- Order: Diptera
- Family: Syrphidae
- Subfamily: Eristalinae
- Tribe: Milesiini
- Genus: Syritta
- Species: S. latitarsata

Binomial name
- Syritta latitarsata Macquart, 1842

Species of fly

Syritta latitarsata is a species of syrphid fly in the family Syrphidae.

== Distribution ==
Namibia, Egypt.
