= Syritta bulbus =

Scientific classification
- Kingdom: Animalia
- Phylum: Arthropoda
- Clade: Pancrustacea
- Class: Insecta
- Order: Diptera
- Family: Syrphidae
- Subfamily: Eristalinae
- Tribe: Milesiini
- Genus: Syritta
- Species: S. bulbus

Binomial name
- Syritta bulbus Walker, 1849

Synonyms
- Syritta bulbulus Speiser, 1913

Species of fly

Syritta bulbus is a species of syrphid fly in the family Syrphidae.

== Distribution ==
Cameroun, Congo, Ghana, Malawi, Zimbabwe.
