= Syritta vittata =

Scientific classification
- Kingdom: Animalia
- Phylum: Arthropoda
- Clade: Pancrustacea
- Class: Insecta
- Order: Diptera
- Family: Syrphidae
- Subfamily: Eristalinae
- Tribe: Milesiini
- Genus: Syritta
- Species: S. vittata

Binomial name
- Syritta vittata Portschinsky, 1875

Species of fly

Syritta vittata is a species of syrphid fly in the family Syrphidae.

== Distribution ==
Iran, Turkmenistan, Pakistan.
