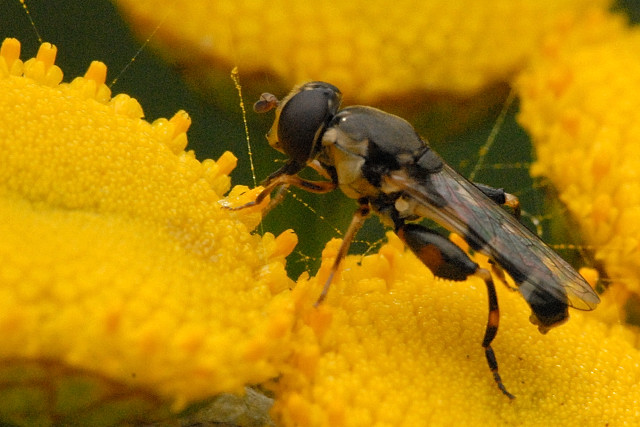
- male Syritta pipiens

Scientific classification
- Kingdom: Animalia
- Phylum: Arthropoda
- Class: Insecta
- Order: Diptera
- Family: Syrphidae
- Subfamily: Eristalinae
- Tribe: Milesiini
- Genus: Syritta; Le Peletier & Serville, 1828

Type species
- Musca pipiens Linnaeus, 1758

Diversity
- 60 species

Synonyms
- Coprina Zetterstedt, 1837; Volvula Gistel, 1848; Siritta Rondani, 1873; Trizota Verrall, 1882; Austrosyritta Marnef, 1967

= Syritta =

Genus of hoverflies

Syritta is a genus of hoverflies, family Syrphidae.

The genus probably originated in the Afrotropical region. 13 of the 18 recognized species groups are found south of the Sahara. 15 species inhabit the Oriental and Australian-Pacific regions, and only six species are described from the Palearctic region. The two species that occur in North America as far south as Mexico, S. flaviventris and S. pipiens, were probably introduced by humans.

One of the most common species of this genus is Syritta pipiens, a hoverfly from Europe, currently distributed across Eurasia and North America.

== Species ==
- Syritta aenigmatopatria Hardy, 1964
- Syritta albopilosa Lyneborg & Barkemeyer, 2005
- Syritta angulata Lyneborg & Barkemeyer, 2005
- Syritta asiatica Lyneborg & Barkemeyer, 2005
- Syritta austeni Bezzi, 1915
- Syritta barbata Lyneborg & Barkemeyer, 2005 – West Africa
- Syritta breva Lyneborg & Barkemeyer, 2005
- Syritta bulbus Walker, 1849 – West Africa
- Syritta caboverdensis Lyneborg & Barkemeyer, 2005
- Syritta carbonaria Lyneborg & Barkemeyer, 2005
- Syritta cerca Lyneborg & Barkemeyer, 2005
- Syritta congoensis Lyneborg & Barkemeyer, 2005
- Syritta decora Walker, 1849
- Syritta dentata Lyneborg & Barkemeyer, 2005
- Syritta dilatata Keiser, 1971
- Syritta divergata Lyneborg & Barkemeyer, 2005 – West Africa
- Syritta fasciata (Wiedemann, 1830) – West Africa
- Syritta flaviventris Macquart, 1842 – Africa, Europe, introduced to South and North America and Easter Island
- Syritta fusca Lyneborg & Barkemeyer, 2005
- Syritta hackeri Klocker, 1924 – Australia, Hawai'i, Java
- Syritta hirta Curran, 1939
- Syritta hova Lyneborg & Barkemeyer, 2005
- Syritta incrassata Lyneborg & Barkemeyer, 2005
- Syritta indica Wiedemann, 1824 – India, Nepal, Taiwan
- Syritta lanipes Bezzi, 1921
- Syritta latitarsata Macquart, 1842
- Syritta leona Lyneborg & Barkemeyer, 2005
- Syritta leucopleura Bigot, 1859 – West Africa
- Syritta londti Lyneborg & Barkemeyer, 2005
- Syritta longiseta Lyneborg & Barkemeyer, 2005 – West Africa
- Syritta luteinervis Meijere, 1908
- Syritta lyneborgi Steenis, 2010
- Syritta maritima Hull, 1944
- Syritta minuta Lyneborg & Barkemeyer, 2005
- Syritta montana Lyneborg & Barkemeyer, 2005
- Syritta natalensis Lyneborg & Barkemeyer, 2005
- Syritta nigrifemorata Macquart, 1842
- Syritta noona Lyneborg & Barkemeyer, 2005 – Papua New Guinea
- Syritta oceanica Macquart, 1855 – Australia, Polynesia, Hawai'i, Solomon Islands
- Syritta orientalis Macquart, 1842 – India, Australia, Hawai'i, Indonesia, Micronesia
- Syritta papua Lyneborg & Barkemeyer, 2005 – Papua New Guinea
- Syritta pilosa Lyneborg & Barkemeyer, 2005
- Syritta pipiens (Linnaeus, 1758)
- Syritta polita Lyneborg & Barkemeyer, 2005 – Papua New Guinea
- Syritta proximata Lyneborg & Barkemeyer, 2005
- Syritta rufa Lyneborg & Barkemeyer, 2005
- Syritta senegalensis Lyneborg & Barkemeyer, 2005
- Syritta similis Lyneborg & Barkemeyer, 2005
- Syritta snyderi Shiraki, 1963 – Bonin Islands
- Syritta stigmatica Loew, 1858 – West Africa
- Syritta stuckenbergi Lyneborg & Barkemeyer, 2005
- Syritta stylata Lyneborg & Barkemeyer, 2005
- Syritta thompsoni Lyneborg & Barkemeyer, 2005
- Syritta tomentosa Lyneborg & Barkemeyer, 2005
- Syritta unicolor Lyneborg & Barkemeyer, 2005
- Syritta vitripennis Bigot, 1885
- Syritta vittata Portschinsky, 1857 – East Palaearctic
- Syritta vockerothi Lyneborg & Barkemeyer, 2005
