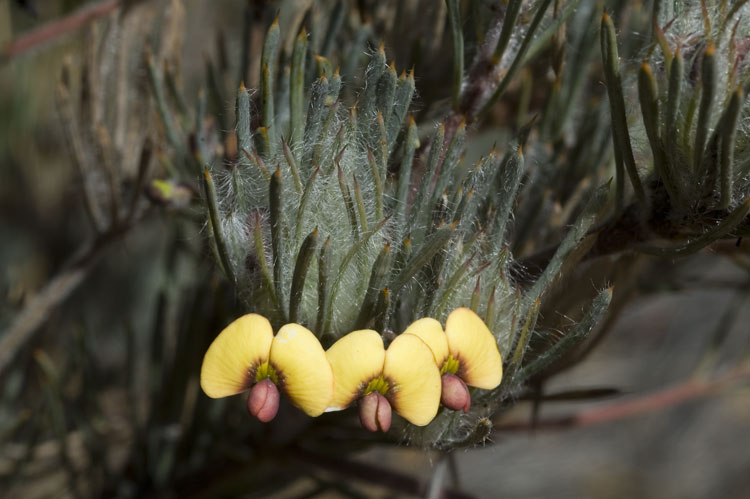
- Near Southern Cross

Scientific classification
- Kingdom: Plantae
- Clade: Tracheophytes
- Clade: Angiosperms
- Clade: Eudicots
- Clade: Rosids
- Order: Fabales
- Family: Fabaceae
- Subfamily: Faboideae
- Genus: Daviesia
- Species: D. croniniana

Binomial name
- Daviesia croniniana F.Muell.

= Daviesia croniniana =

Species of flowering plant

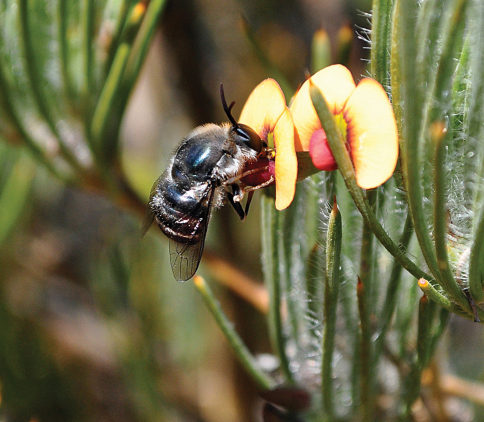
Panops baudini feeding on D. croniniana

Daviesia croniniana is a species of flowering plant in the family Fabaceae and is endemic to the south-west of Western Australia. It is a compact, bushy shrub with hairy foliage, erect, broadly linear phyllodes and yellow or orange and reddish-brown flowers.

== Description ==
Daviesia croniniana is a compact, bushy shrub that typically grows to a height of 0.4–1.5 m (1 ft 4 in – 4 ft 11 in) and has hairy, ridged branchlets. Its leaves are reduced to crowded, erect, hairy, linear phyllodes 28–50 mm (1.1–2.0 in) long, 1–2 mm (0.039–0.079 in) wide and are widest near the tip. The flowers are arranged in groups of two or three in leaf axils on a peduncle about 1.5 mm (0.059 in) long, each flower on a pedicel 6–8 mm (0.24–0.31 in) long with clusters of bracts at the base. The sepals are 4.0–5.5 mm (0.16–0.22 in) long and joined at the base, the two upper lobes joined for most of their length and the lower three triangular and about 0.75 mm (0.030 in) long. The standard is yellow or orange with red markings, 9–11 mm (0.35–0.43 in) long and 10–12 mm (0.39–0.47 in) wide, the wings 7.5–8.5 mm (0.30–0.33 in) long and the keel about 6 mm (0.24 in) long. Flowering occurs from August to January and the fruit is a triangular pod 12–14 mm (0.47–0.55 in) long.

== Taxonomy and naming ==
Daviesia croniniana was first formally described in 1894 by Ferdinand von Mueller in The Victorian Naturalist from specimens collected by Michael Cronin "towards Lake Lefroy". The specific epithet (croniniana) honours the collector of the type specimens.

== Distribution and habitat ==
This species of pea grows in sandplains and kwongan heathland between Coolgardie, Cunderdin and Marble Rocks Nature Reserve in the Avon Wheatbelt, Coolgardie and Mallee biogeographic regions of south-western Western Australia.

== Conservation status ==
Daviesia croniniana is classified as "not threatened" by the Government of Western Australia Department of Biodiversity, Conservation and Attractions.
