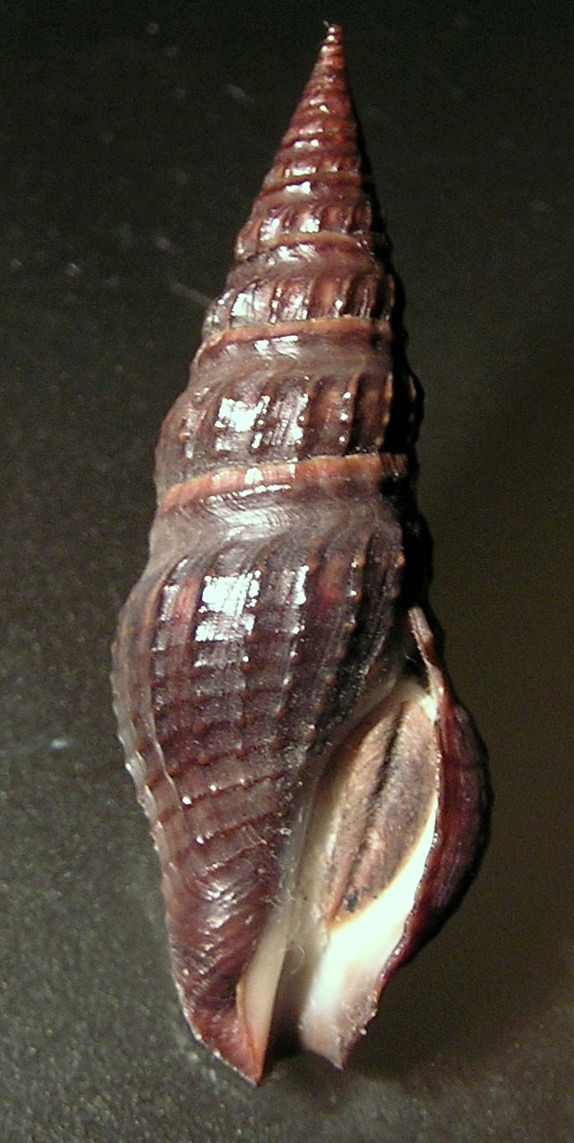
- Shell of Crassispira incrassata

Scientific classification
- Kingdom: Animalia
- Phylum: Mollusca
- Class: Gastropoda
- Subclass: Caenogastropoda
- Order: Neogastropoda
- Superfamily: Conoidea
- Family: Pseudomelatomidae
- Genus: Crassispira
- Species: C. incrassata

Binomial name
- Crassispira incrassata (Sowerby I, 1834)

Synonyms
- Pleurotoma incrassata Sowerby I, 1834

= Crassispira incrassata =

Species of gastropod

Crassispira incrassata is a species of predatory sea snail in the family Pseudomelatomidae. This species is endemic to the Sea of Cortez, ranging from Western Mexico to Ecuador in intertidal zones. First described in 1834 by George Brettingham Sowerby I, C. incrassata was reclassified by William Swainson as the holotype specimen for the Crassispira genus, but its current taxonomic rank is unclear. The shell has a dark colored, coiled pattern covered in black periostracum.

== Taxonomy ==
Crassispira incrassata is a species of sea snail in the family Pseudomelatomidae. It was first described in 1834 by British conchologist George Brettingham Sowerby I as Pleurotoma incrassata in his report to the Zoological Society of London. In 1839, Louis Charles Kiener described the species as Pleurotoma bottae. The species was later reclassified as Crassispira incrassata following William Swainson's establishment of the Crassispira genus, for which the holotype specimen of Pleurotoma bottae was used as the type species. In 1958, James Hamilton McLean and Myra Keen proposed that C. incrassata represented a southern variation of C. bottae, but this classification has not been widely adopted.

== Description ==
Crassispira incrassata is a turrid (predatory snail) with a mean weight of 20.2 grams (0.045 lb). The species reproduces sexually and engages in mucus mediated gliding for locomotion.

=== Shell ===
C. incrassata has a dextrally coiled shell with a grooved, dark colored shell that hosts a lighter colored interior. The length of the shell ranges between 30 millimetres (1.2 in) and 50 millimetres (2.0 in), and the shell's diameter is 15 millimetres (0.59 in). The dark brown shell is coated in a black colored periostracum. The shell is thickest at its base and tapers off to a pyramidal point. The whorls have an incomplete keel along the suture and the keel is ribbed longitudinally. These ribs are grained and are crossed with raised lines. The outer lip is thickened near the edge. The sinus is broad and the siphonal canal is short. C. incrassata's shell differs from Crassispira bottae in that it is slightly larger, has a shorter aperture, and the spine tapers off sooner.

=== Digestive Tract ===
The rhynchodeum sphincter is large, posteriorly located, and contiguous with the proboscis wall. The proboscis retractor muscles are large and connected to the rhynchodeum. The proboscis is half the length of the rhychodeum and is coiled inside it. The buccal tube has two anterior sphincters and a sac-like structure. There is an epithelial pad but no intermediate sphincter. Both the buccal tube wall and proboscis wall are thick, but the buccal lips and buccal sac are thin and small. The buccal mass is thickly walled and very large relative to other species of snail. The oesophagus runs between the buccal mass and nerve ring. The salivary glands and circular muscle are also very large relative to the snail's size. The venom gland is ciliated before opening up into the buccal cavity behind the oesophagus. The odontophore is medium-sized and made of a single layer of cells that forms a pair of unfused cartilage. The radula consists of wishbone-shaped teeth; the marginal tooth measuring at 180 μm (0.007 in) in length.

== Distribution and ecology ==
C. incrassata is endemic to the Sea of Cortez, and commonly found from Western Mexico to Ecuador. C. incrassata is found in intertidal zones and can extend as deep as 18.3 metres (60 ft). The double-crested cormorant predates on this species of snail.
