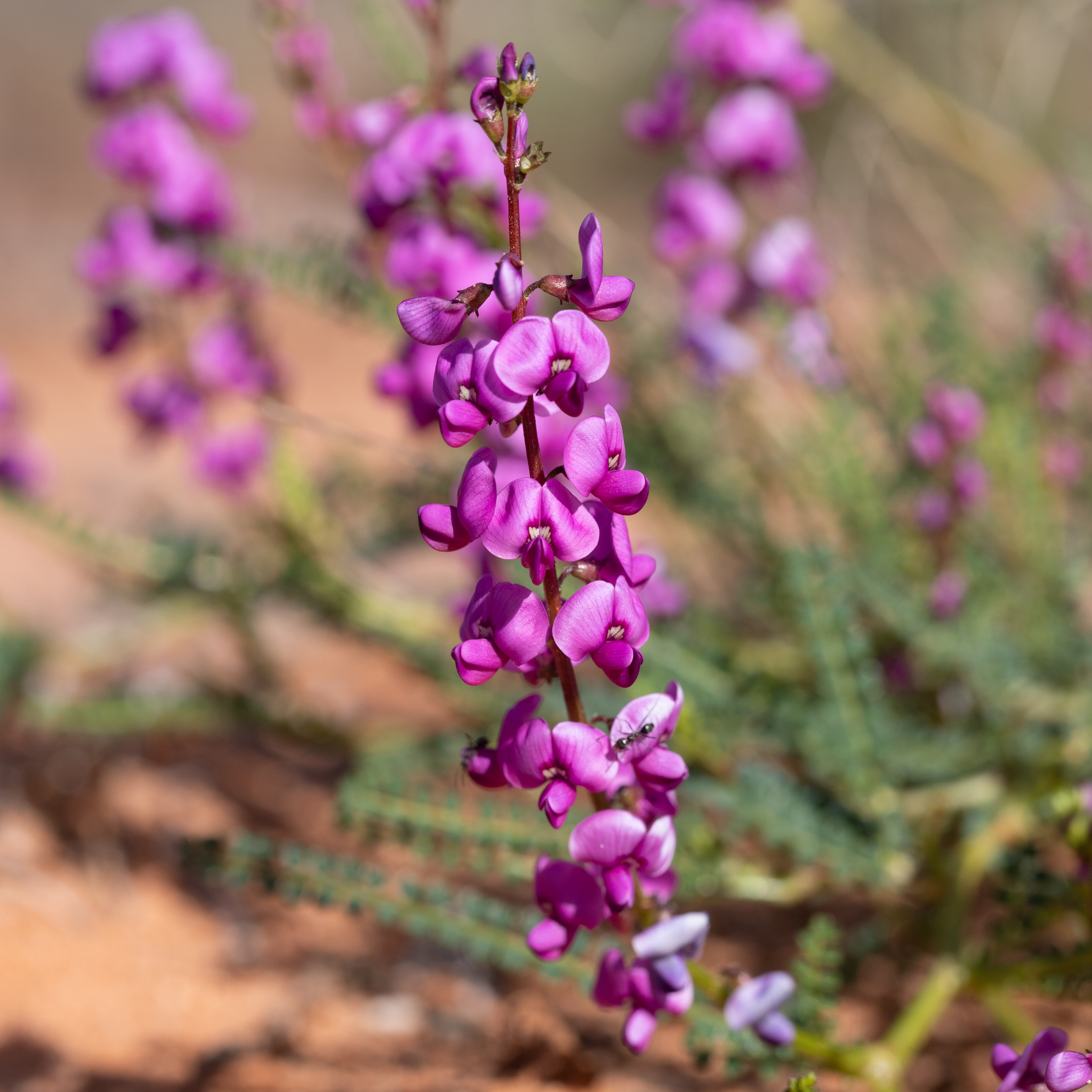

Scientific classification
- Kingdom: Plantae
- Clade: Tracheophytes
- Clade: Angiosperms
- Clade: Eudicots
- Clade: Rosids
- Order: Fabales
- Family: Fabaceae
- Subfamily: Faboideae
- Genus: Swainsona
- Species: S. microphylla

Binomial name
- Swainsona microphylla A.Gray

Synonyms
- List: Swainsona microphylla A.Gray subsp. microphylla; Swainsona microphylla subsp. minima A.T.Lee; Swainsona microphylla subsp. tomentosa A.T.Lee; Swainsona microphylla var. minima J.M.Black nom. inval.; Swainsona microphylla var. tomentosa J.M.Black nom. inval.

= Swainsona microphylla =

Small-leaf swainson-pea

Species of legume

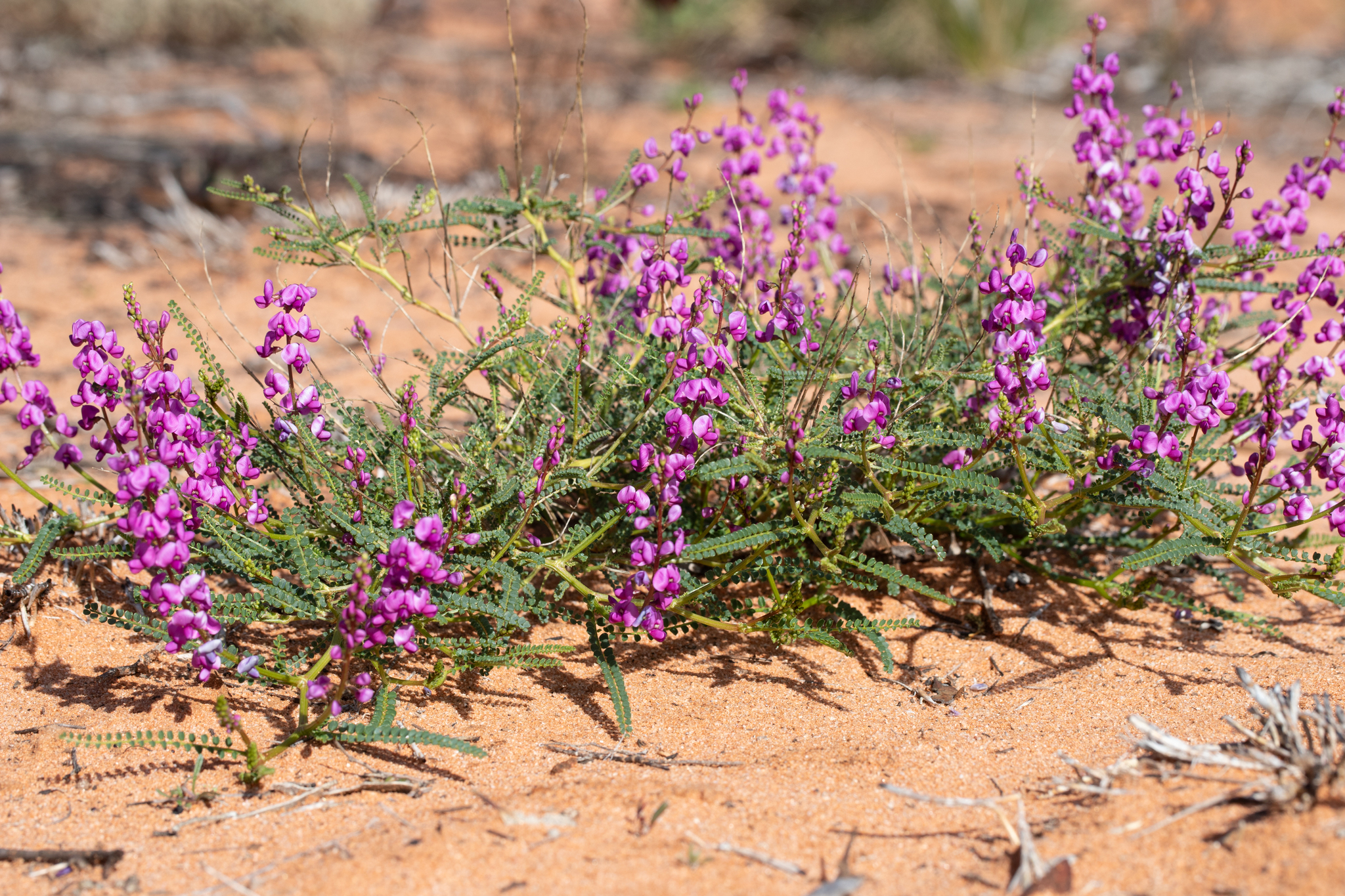
Habit in the Gluepot Reserve

Swainsona microphylla, commonly known as small-leaf swainson-pea, small-leaf swainsona, or poison swainson-pea is a species of flowering plant in the family Fabaceae and is endemic to mainland Australia. It is a prostrate or low-growing, sometimes erect perennial herb, with imparipinnate leaves with mostly 21 to 41 broadly wedge-shaped to round leaflets and racemes of 5 to 10 white, pink or purple flowers.

== Description ==
Swainsona microphylla is a prostrate or low-growing, sometimes erect perennial herb that typically grows to a height of up to 60 cm (24 in) long and sometimes has softly-hairy branches. The leaves are imparipinnate, mostly 50–150 mm (2.0–5.9 in) long with mostly broadly wedge-shaped to round leaflets, the leaflets 1–5 mm (0.039–0.197 in) long and wide with stipules 1–4 mm (0.039–0.157 in) long at the base of the petioles. The flowers are white, pink or purple, arranged in racemes of 10 to 25, on a peduncle 10–30 mm (0.39–1.18 in) wide, each flower 6–10 mm (0.24–0.39 in) long on a pedicel 1–2 mm (0.039–0.079 in) long. The sepals are joined at the base to form a tube about 1 mm (0.039 in) long, with teeth much shorter than the tube. The standard petal is 6–8 mm (0.24–0.31 in) long and 6–9 mm (0.24–0.35 in) wide, the wings 6–7 mm (0.24–0.28 in) long and the keel 4.5–7 mm (0.18–0.28 in) long and 2–3 mm (0.079–0.118 in) broad. The fruit is an almost spherical pod 5–10 mm (0.20–0.39 in) long and 3–9 mm (0.12–0.35 in) wide with the remains of the style 2–4 mm (0.079–0.157 in) long.

== Taxonomy and naming ==
Swainsona microphylla was first formally described in 1854 by Asa Gray in the United States Exploring Expedition Phanerogamia. The specific epithet (microphylla) means "small-leaved".

== Distribution ==
This species of pea grows in sandy soils on sandplains and sand hills, and is found in all mainland Australian states and the Northern Territory. In Victoria, it is mainly restricted to the far north-west of that state. In New South Wales, it is found on the western slopes and plains. In Western Australia it is widespread in inland areas. In South Australia, the species is widespread in scattered areas and in the Northern Territory it occurs in the south.
