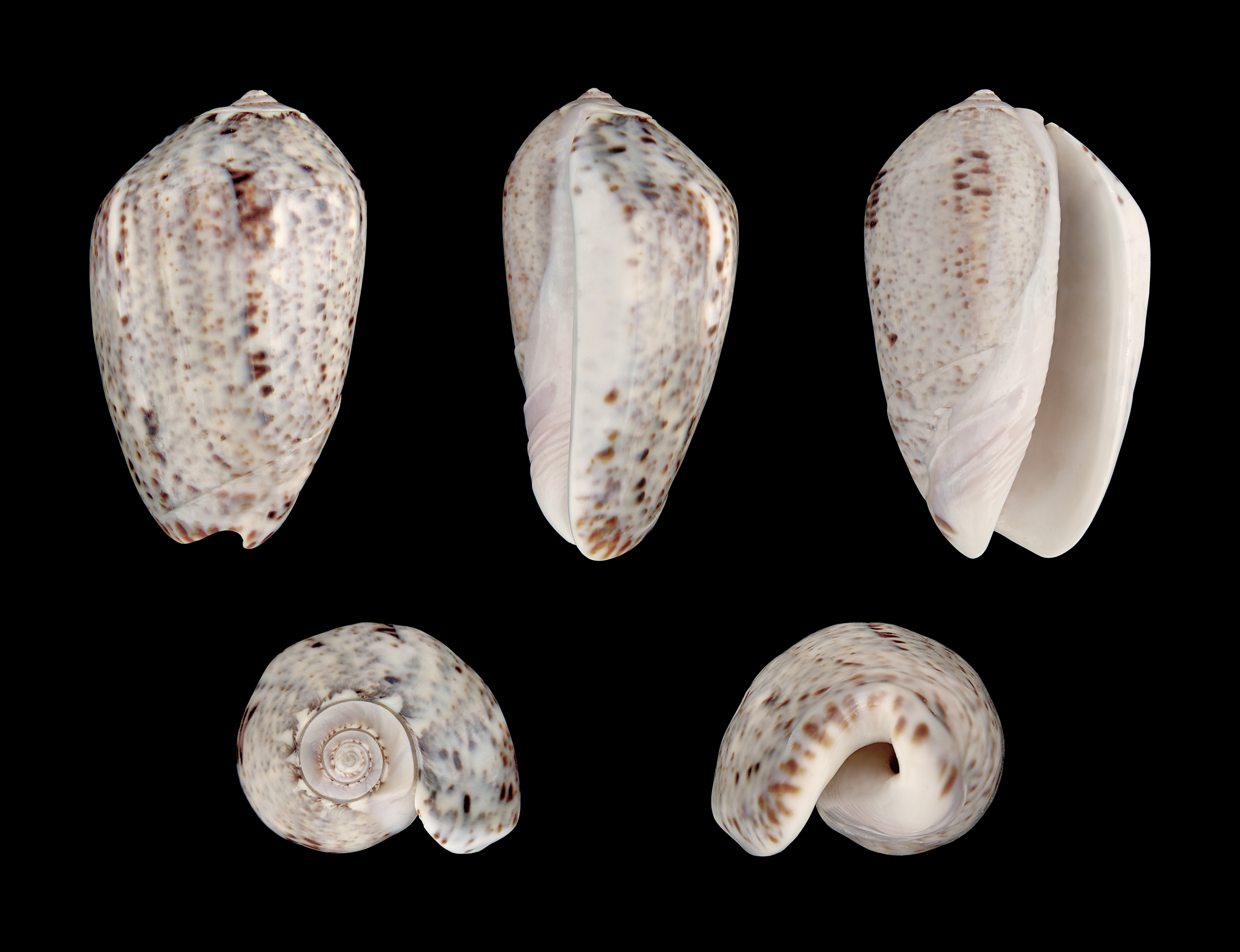
- Five views of a shell of Oliva incrassata

Scientific classification
- Kingdom: Animalia
- Phylum: Mollusca
- Class: Gastropoda
- Subclass: Caenogastropoda
- Order: Neogastropoda
- Family: Olividae
- Genus: Oliva
- Species: O. incrassata

Binomial name
- Oliva incrassata (Lightfoot in Solander, 1786)

Synonyms
- Oliva burchorum Zeigler, 1969; Oliva nivea Pilsbry, 1910

= Oliva incrassata =

Species of gastropod

Oliva incrassata, the angled olive or giant olive, is a species of sea snail, a marine gastropod mollusk in the family Olividae, the olives.

== Distribution ==
This species is widespread from California to Peru.

== Habitat ==
These sea snails live at the low-tide level, at the outer side of sandspits.

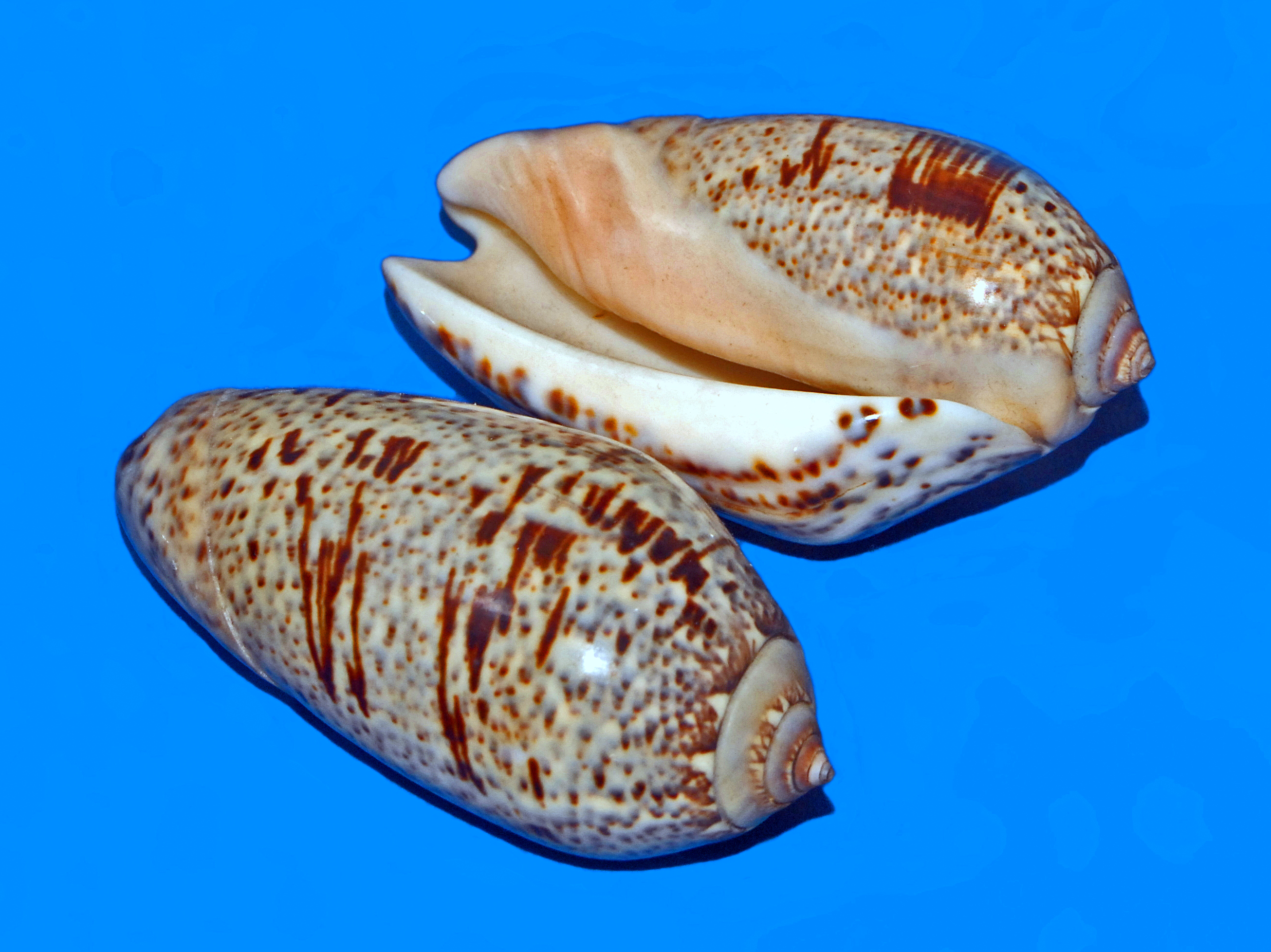
Shells of Oliva incrassata from Panama, on display at the Museo Civico di Storia Naturale di Milano

== Description ==
Shells of Oliva incrassata can reach a length of 32–95 millimetres (1.3–3.7 in). These relatively large shells are almost cylindrical, very thick, ovate, angularly swollen in the middle, with a rather short spire, a narrow and long aperture and usually with uniformly colored body whorls, except in the columellar area. The basic color background may vary from ash-white or greyish to light yellow and brown, mottled with gray and olive, with angled transverse dark chestnut streaks and a fleshy rosy pink columellar area.

== Biology ==
The Giant Olives are active predators. At night they search for food, while during the day they bury themselves beneath the sand and mud.

== Bibliography ==
- Sowerby G. B. [first of the name] (1825). A catalogue of the shells contained in the collection of the late Earl of Tankerville. London, privately published : VII + 92 + XXXIV pp.
- Tursch B., Duchamps R. & Greifeneder D. - Studies on Olividae, XX. The pre-Lamarckian names for Oliva species. APEX 9 (2/3) 51–78, July, 1994
- Zeigler R.F. & Porreca H.C. - Olive Shells of the World. Rochester Polychrome Press, N.Y. 1969.
