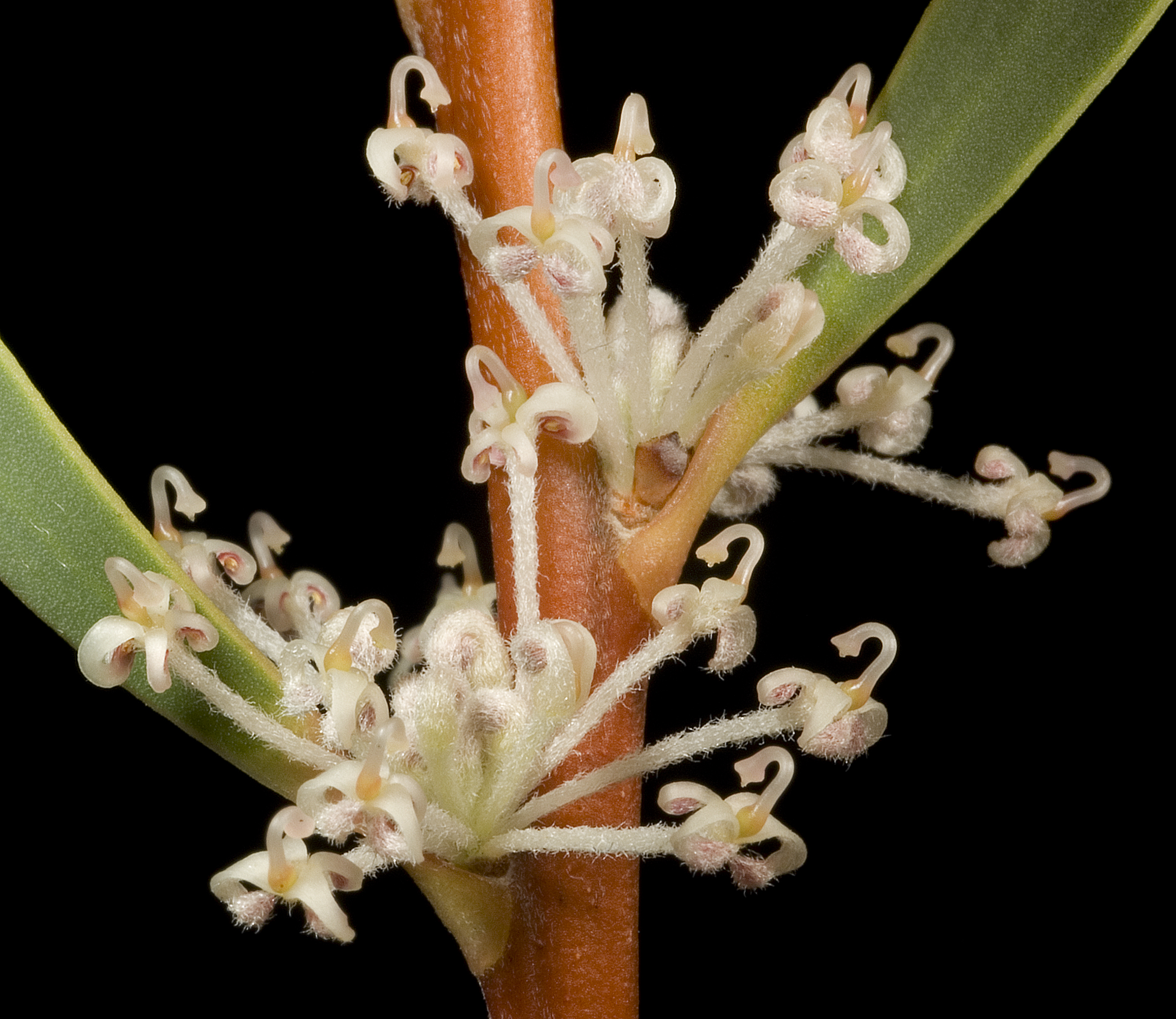

Scientific classification
- Kingdom: Plantae
- Clade: Tracheophytes
- Clade: Angiosperms
- Clade: Eudicots
- Order: Proteales
- Family: Proteaceae
- Genus: Hakea
- Species: H. incrassata

Binomial name
- Hakea incrassata R.Br.
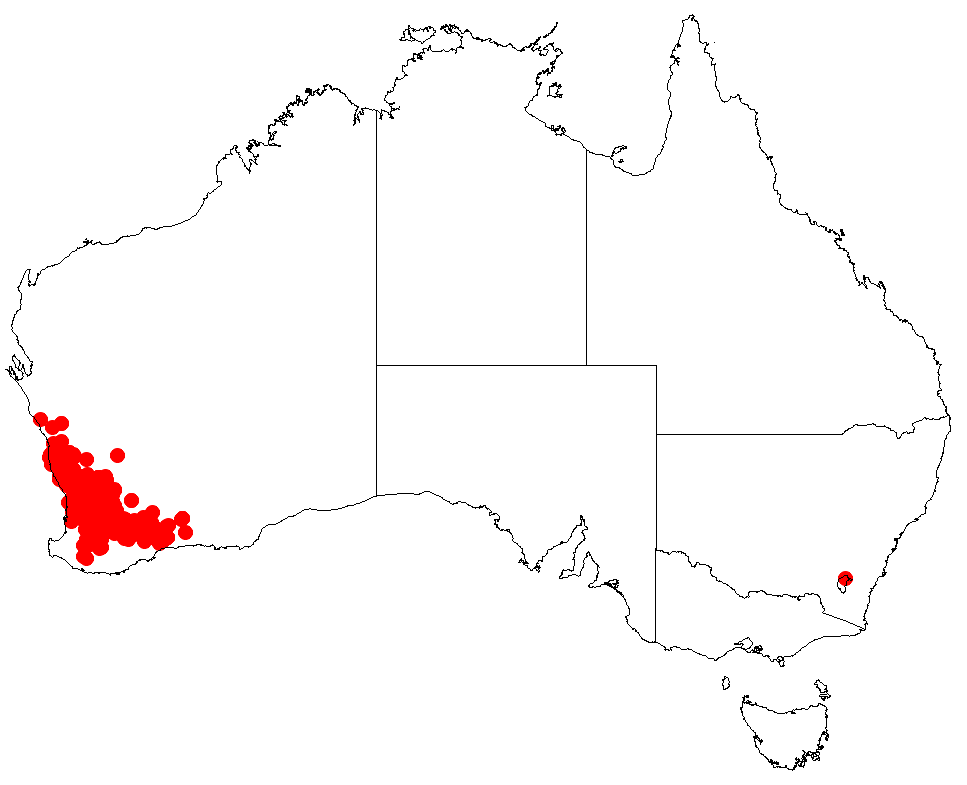
- Occurrence data from AVH

= Hakea incrassata =

Marble hakea

Species of shrub endemic to Western Australia

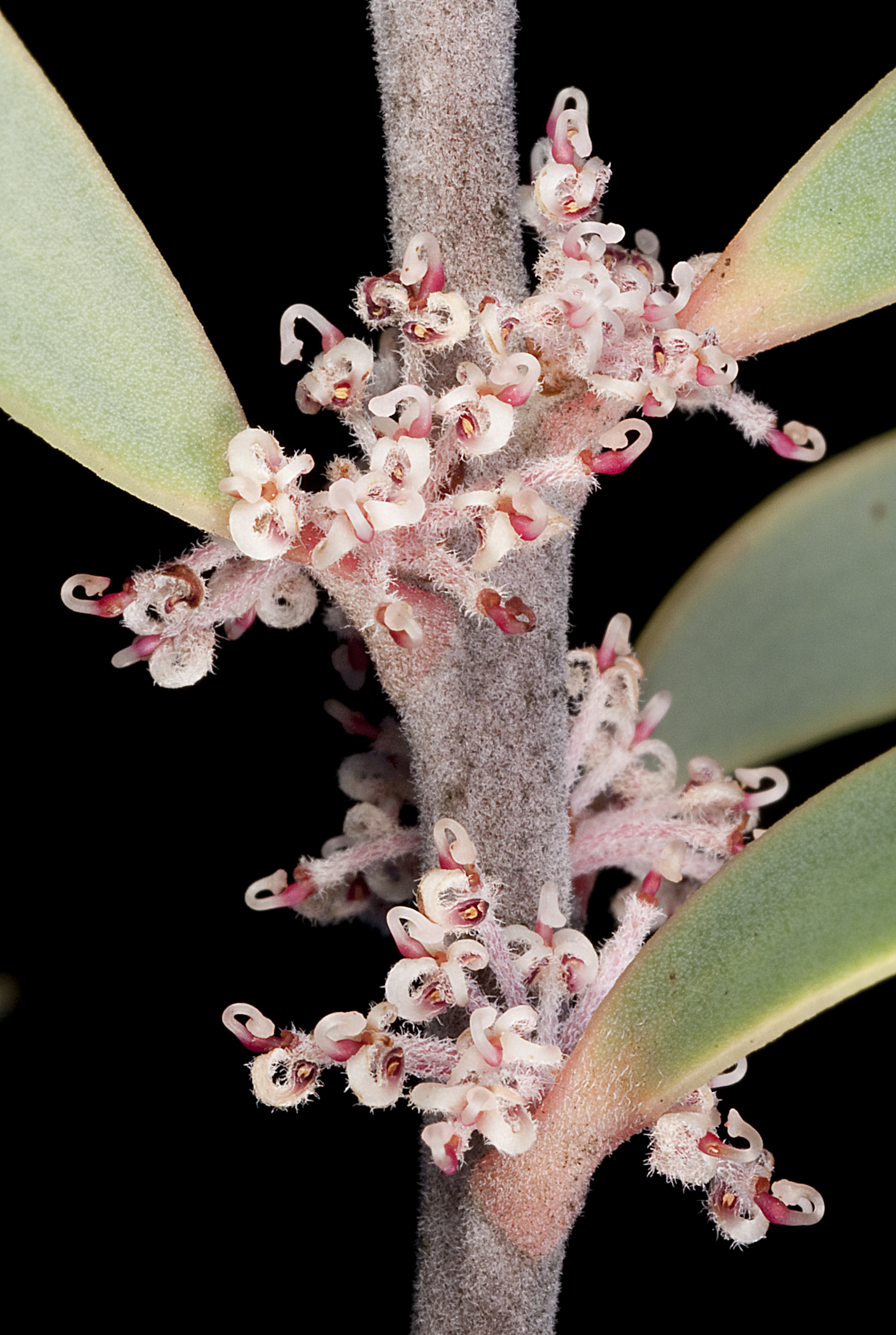
Hakea incrassata inflorescence

Hakea incrassata, commonly known as marble hakea, is a shrub in the family Proteaceae and is endemic to Western Australia.

== Description ==
Hakea incrassata is a spreading or low compact shrub typically growing to a height of 0.35 to 1.5 metres (1 to 5 ft) and forms a lignotuber. The branchlets have white flattened and matted fine hairs. The flat, rigid and evergreen leaves are twisted at the base and have a narrowly obovate shape and are 1.1 to 8.5 centimetres (0.43 to 3.35 in) in length and 3 to 11 millimetres (0.118 to 0.433 in) wide. It blooms from June to November and produces white-cream-pink flowers. Each axillary inflorescence is usually found arising from old wood and contains 6 to 16 flowers. The perianth is around 2 mm (0.079 in) in length and covered with stiff white to pale brown hairs. The pistil has a length of 1.9 to 2.5 mm (0.075 to 0.098 in). Following flowering globular smooth or black-pusticulate fruit form that are 1.7 to 3.3 cm (0.67 to 1.30 in) in length with about the same width. The seeds within have a wing around the body which is 12 to 20 millimetres (0.47 to 0.79 in) long.

== Taxonomy and naming ==
Hakea incrassata was first formally described by the botanist Robert Brown in 1830 as part of the work Supplementum primum prodromi florae Novae Hollandiae. The only known synonym is Hakea leucadendron as described by Carl Meissner. The specific epithet is from the Latin word crassatus meaning 'thickened'. It is not known what is being referred to but it is thought it could be in reference to the stalk that the fruit is supported by.

== Distribution and habitat ==
Marble hakea is endemic throughout a large area of the Wheatbelt, Great Southern and Goldfields–Esperance regions of Western Australia from Northampton in the north west to Ravensthorpe in the south east. It is found in open low heath communities where it is found in sandy or gravelly soils around or over laterite or granite.
