= Meruliporia incrassata =

Scientific classification
- Kingdom: Fungi
- Division: Basidiomycota
- Class: Agaricomycetes
- Order: Boletales
- Family: Coniophoraceae
- Genus: Meruliporia
- Species: M. incrassata

Binomial name
- Meruliporia incrassata (Berk. & M.A. Curtis) Murrill. (1942)

Synonyms
- Merulius incrassatus Berk. & M.A. Curtis. (1849); Poria incrassata Berk. & M.A. Curtis. Burt. (1917); Serpula incrassata Berk. & M.A. Curtis. Donk. (1949); Sesia incrassata Berk. & M.A. Curtis. Kuntze.(1891)

Species of fungus

Meruliporia incrassata is a fungus that causes dry rot, predominantly in North America, where it can also be known by the diminutive "poria", which is also a recognized historical synonym for the genus.

== Environment, distribution and behaviour ==
M. incrassata has a wide range of favourable temperatures, growing aerobically from the freezing point to approximately 38 °C, by consuming cellulose but not lignin. While it is known as "dry rot", this is a misnomer linked to the resulting decay of the wood being powdery and cracked; the fungus, like many fungi, does require moisture. It is highly sensitive to temperatures above its range when compared to other rots. Its rhizomorphs have the ability to conduct water up to 7.6 metres (25 ft) from a water source, meaning it can affect dry wood provided there is abundant water nearby, and can readily draw water from soil. These rhizomorphs are up to 5 cm (2.0 in) thick and up to 9 m (30 ft) long. It tends to reside in the Southern United States, but with some prevalence in the northern United States and southern Canada.

Its behaviour mirrors that of the other dry rot fungus Serpula lacrymans, which is more prevalent in Europe and extant in the northern United States. It seems to have spread substantially in the middle of the 20th century, coinciding with importation of softwood, but its origin is unknown, as it was found in the American South, Northeast, and Pacific Northwest.

== Management ==
M. incrassata can be managed through construction techniques that minimize water, and preventing penetration of the foundation by rhizomorphs. Crawlspace foundations that are poorly ventilated pose a high risk compared to slab foundations or well-ventilated and drained crawlspaces.
