= Antaeotricha incrassata =

Scientific classification
- Domain: Eukaryota
- Kingdom: Animalia
- Phylum: Arthropoda
- Class: Insecta
- Order: Lepidoptera
- Family: Depressariidae
- Genus: Antaeotricha
- Species: A. incrassata

Binomial name
- Antaeotricha incrassata Meyrick, 1916

Species of moth

Antaeotricha incrassata is a moth of the family Depressariidae. It is found in French Guiana.

The wingspan is about 21 mm. The forewings are pale fuscous suffused with white, especially towards the costa and posteriorly. The markings are dark fuscous. There is a short oblique irregular mark from the base of the costa and an oblique mark above the base of the dorsum, as well as three oblique transverse lines thickened at the extremities, the first from one-fifth of the costa to the middle of the dorsum, irregular, the second from the middle of the costa to four-fifths of the dorsum, rather irregular and the third from three-fourths of the costa to the tornus, indented above the middle, slightly curved below this, the space between this and the second line suffused with fuscous on the dorsal third. About seven marginal dots are found around the apex and termen. The hindwings are whitish, tinged with grey towards the termen. The upper part of the terminal edge is dark grey and there is a very long whitish subcostal hairpencil from the base lying beneath the forewings, reaching four-fifths of the wing.
