= Jacksonia velutina =

Conservation status
- Priority Four — Rare Taxa (DEC)

Scientific classification
- Kingdom: Plantae
- Clade: Tracheophytes
- Clade: Angiosperms
- Clade: Eudicots
- Clade: Rosids
- Order: Fabales
- Family: Fabaceae
- Subfamily: Faboideae
- Genus: Jacksonia
- Species: J. velutina

Binomial name
- Jacksonia velutina Benth.

Synonyms
- Piptomeris velutina (Benth.) Greene

Species of legume

Jacksonia velutina is a species of flowering plant in the family Fabaceae and is endemic to the a north-west of Western Australia. It is an erect, broom-like shrub with greyish-green branches, the end branches sharply-pointed cladodes, leaves reduced to dark brown, egg-shaped scales, yellow-orange flowers with red markings clustered along the branches, and membranous, densely hairy, elliptic pods.

== Description ==
Jacksonia velutina is an erect, broom-like, coarse shrub that typically grows up to 0.5–2.6 m (1 ft 8 in – 8 ft 6 in) high and 0.9–2 m (2 ft 11 in – 6 ft 7 in) wide. It has greyish-green branches, the end branches sharply-pointed cladodes, its leaves reduced to egg-shaped, dark brown scales, 1–3 mm (0.039–0.118 in) long and 1.3–3 mm (0.051–0.118 in) wide. The flowers are in clusters along the branches on curved pedicels 1.6–2.4 mm (0.063–0.094 in) long, with thread-like bracteoles 1.9–3.3 mm (0.075–0.130 in) long, 0.35–0.6 mm (0.014–0.024 in) wide on the base of the floral tube, but that fall off as the flowers mature. The floral tube is 1.2–1.35 mm (0.047–0.053 in) long and not ribbed, and the sepals are membranous, with lobes 6.9–10 mm (0.27–0.39 in) long, 1.8–2.6 mm (0.071–0.102 in) wide and fused for 1.0–1.3 mm (0.039–0.051 in). The standard petal is yellow-orange with red markings only on the inner surface, 7.2–8.7 mm (0.28–0.34 in) long and 12.1–13 mm (0.48–0.51 in) deep, the wings yellow-orange with red markings, 5.4–6.2 mm (0.21–0.24 in) long, and the keel is dark red, 7.5–8.7 mm (0.30–0.34 in) long. The stamens have yellow filaments with a red tip, 4.5–8.7 mm (0.18–0.34 in) long. Flowering occurs from July to November, and the fruit is a membranous, flattened elliptic, densely hairy pod 6.3–8.0 mm (0.25–0.31 in) long and 2.4–2.5 mm (0.094–0.098 in) wide.

== Taxonomy ==
Jacksonia velutina was first formally described in 1864 by George Bentham in Flora Australiensis from specimens collected by Augustus Oldfield in the Swan River Colony. The specific epithet (velutina) means 'velvety'.

== Distribution and habitat ==
This species of Jacksonia grows in yellow sand over laterite or limestone in shrubland and is found from the Billabong Roadhouse south of Shark Bay to Watheroo in the Avon Wheatbelt, Geraldton Sandplains and Yalgoo bioregions of Western Australia.

== Conservation status ==
Jacksonia velutina is listed as "Priority Four" by the Government of Western Australia Department of Biodiversity, Conservation and Attractions, meaning that is rare or near threatened.
