= Caladenia incrassata =

Puppet clown orchid

Scientific classification
- Kingdom: Plantae
- Clade: Tracheophytes
- Clade: Angiosperms
- Clade: Monocots
- Order: Asparagales
- Family: Orchidaceae
- Subfamily: Orchidoideae
- Tribe: Diurideae
- Genus: Caladenia
- Species: C. incrassata

Binomial name
- Caladenia incrassata Hopper & A.P.Br.

Synonyms
- Calonemorchis incrassata (Hopper & A.P.Br.) D.L.Jones & M.A.Clem.; Calonema incrassatum (Hopper & A.P.Br.) D.L.Jones & M.A.Clem.; Jonesiopsis incrassata (Hopper & A.P.Br.) D.L.Jones & M.A.Clem.; Phlebochilus incrassata (Hopper & A.P.Br.) Szlach. & Rutk.

Species of orchid

Caladenia incrassata, commonly known as the puppet clown orchid, is a species of orchid endemic to the south-west of Western Australia. It has a single, hairy leaf and usually only one greenish-yellow and red flower which has a red-striped labellum.

== Description ==
Caladenia incrassata is a terrestrial, perennial, deciduous, herb with an underground tuber and a single erect, hairy leaf, 100–150 mm (4–6 in) long and about 8 mm (0.3 in) wide. Usually a single greenish-yellow and red flower 30–50 mm (1–2 in) long and 10–20 mm (0.4–0.8 in) wide is borne on a stalk 150–300 mm (6–10 in) tall. All three sepals have thickened, club-like pinkish to yellowish glandular tips. The dorsal sepal is erect or sometimes curved forwards, 15–20 mm (0.6–0.8 in) long and about 2 mm (0.08 in) wide. The lateral sepals are 15–25 mm (0.6–1 in) long and 3–5 mm (0.1–0.2 in) wide and the petals are 13–16 mm (0.5–0.6 in) long and about 2 mm (0.08 in) wide. The labellum is 9–10 mm (0.35–0.39 in) long and 12–13 mm (0.47–0.51 in) wide and yellowish-green to pinkish with a red tip, the end of which is turned downwards. The labellum has smooth edges and there is a dense band of purplish-red calli up to 2 mm (0.08 in) long in the centre. Flowering occurs from August to September.

== Taxonomy and naming ==
Caladenia incrassata was first described in 2001 by Stephen Hopper and Andrew Phillip Brown from a specimen collected on Muddarning Hill north of Koolyanobbing and the description was published in Nuytsia. The specific epithet (incrassata) is a Latin word meaning "thickened" referring to the thicked sepals of this species. (The dorsal sepal of the similar Caladenia brevisura is not thickened and the lateral sepals are less so.)

== Distribution and habitat ==
The puppet clown orchid occurs between Paynes Find and Southern Cross in the Avon Wheatbelt, Coolgardie, Murchison and Yalgoo biogeographic regions where it grows under shrubs on granite outcrops and on ironstone hills.

== Conservation ==
Caladenia incrassata is classified as "not threatened" by the Western Australian Government Department of Parks and Wildlife.
