= Serruria incrassata =

Conservation status
- Endangered (IUCN 3.1)

Scientific classification
- Kingdom: Plantae
- Clade: Tracheophytes
- Clade: Angiosperms
- Clade: Eudicots
- Order: Proteales
- Family: Proteaceae
- Genus: Serruria
- Species: S. incrassata

Binomial name
- Serruria incrassata Meisn., (1856)

Species of plant

Serruria incrassata, the silver-paw spiderhead, is a flowering shrub that belongs to the genus Serruria and forms part of the fynbos. The plant is endemic to the Western Cape and occurs from Moorreesburg to Klipheuwel near the Paarl. The shrub grows to 1.0 m high and flowers from July to October.

The plant's roots sprout again after a fire. Two months after flowering, the fruit falls and ants disperse the seeds. They store the seeds in their nests. The plant is unisexual. Pollination takes place through the action of insects. The plant grows in granite and heavy shale soil at elevations of 150 – 330 m.

== Sources ==
- REDLIST Sanbi
- Biodiversityexplorer
- Protea Atlas
- iNaturalist
- Plants of the World Online
