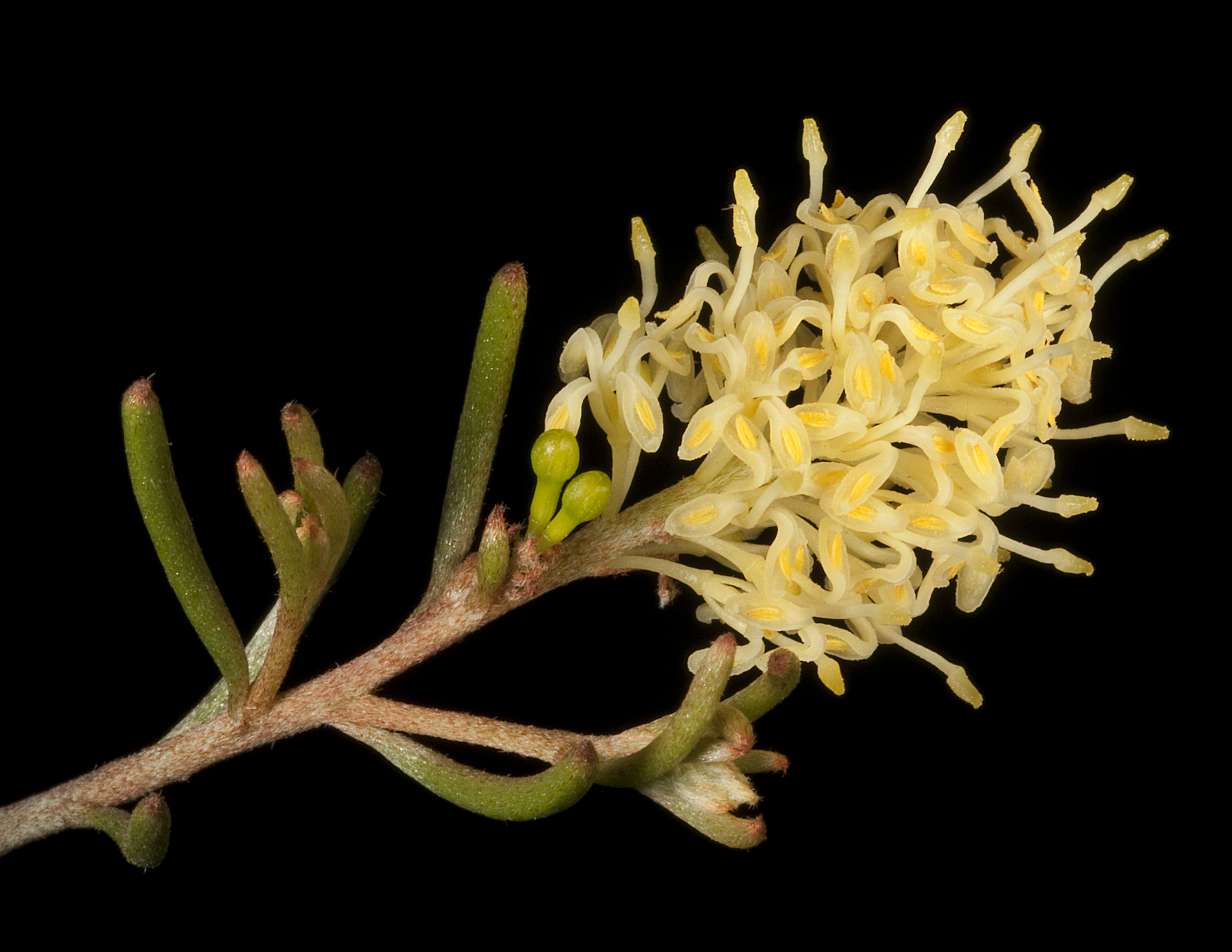
- In Frank Hann National Park

Conservation status
- Vulnerable (IUCN 3.1)

Scientific classification
- Kingdom: Plantae
- Clade: Embryophytes
- Clade: Tracheophytes
- Clade: Angiosperms
- Clade: Eudicots
- Order: Proteales
- Family: Proteaceae
- Genus: Grevillea
- Species: G. incrassata

Binomial name
- Grevillea incrassata Diels

= Grevillea incrassata =

Species of shrub endemic to Western Australia

Grevillea incrassata is a species of flowering plant in the family Proteaceae and is endemic to inland south-western Western Australia. It is an erect shrub with crowded cylindrical or narrowly linear leaves and clusters of bright yellow flowers.

== Description ==
Grevillea inconspicua is an erect shrub that typically grows to a height of 0.3–2.3 m (1 ft 0 in – 7 ft 7 in) and has silky-hairy branchlets. The leaves are crowded and circular in cross-section or linear, 5–25 mm (0.20–0.98 in) long, 0.5–1.5 mm (0.020–0.059 in) wide and silky-hairy. The flowers are arranged in usually branched clusters 10–20 mm (0.39–0.79 in) long on the ends of branches and are bright yellow or golden yellow, the pistil about 7 mm (0.28 in) long. Flowering occurs from September to November and the fruit is a cylindrical to oval follicle 10–16 mm (0.39–0.63 in) long.

== Taxonomy ==
Grevillea incrassata was first formally described in 1904 by Ludwig Diels in Ernst Georg Pritzel's Botanische Jahrbücher für Systematik, Pflanzengeschichte und Pflanzengeographie. The specific epithet (incrassata) means "flattened", referring to the leaves.

== Distribution and habitat ==
This grevillea grows in scrub mallee on sandplains between Narembeen, Southern Cross, Lake King and Peak Charles National Park in the Avon Wheatbelt, Coolgardie, Esperance Plains and Mallee bioregions of inland south-western Western Australia.

== Conservation status ==
Grevillea incrassata is listed as Not Threatened by the Government of Western Australia Department of Biodiversity, Conservation and Attractions but as Vulnerable on the IUCN Red List of Threatened Species. This is due to an estimated decline in population of 30% over the past three generational lengths due to land clearing for agriculture and competition with invasive weeds.

The population is currently stable and occurs within multiple protected areas, though it is restricted to road verges within the Wheatbelt region. Here, it is threatened by verge clearance and weed invasion.

== See also ==
- List of Grevillea species
