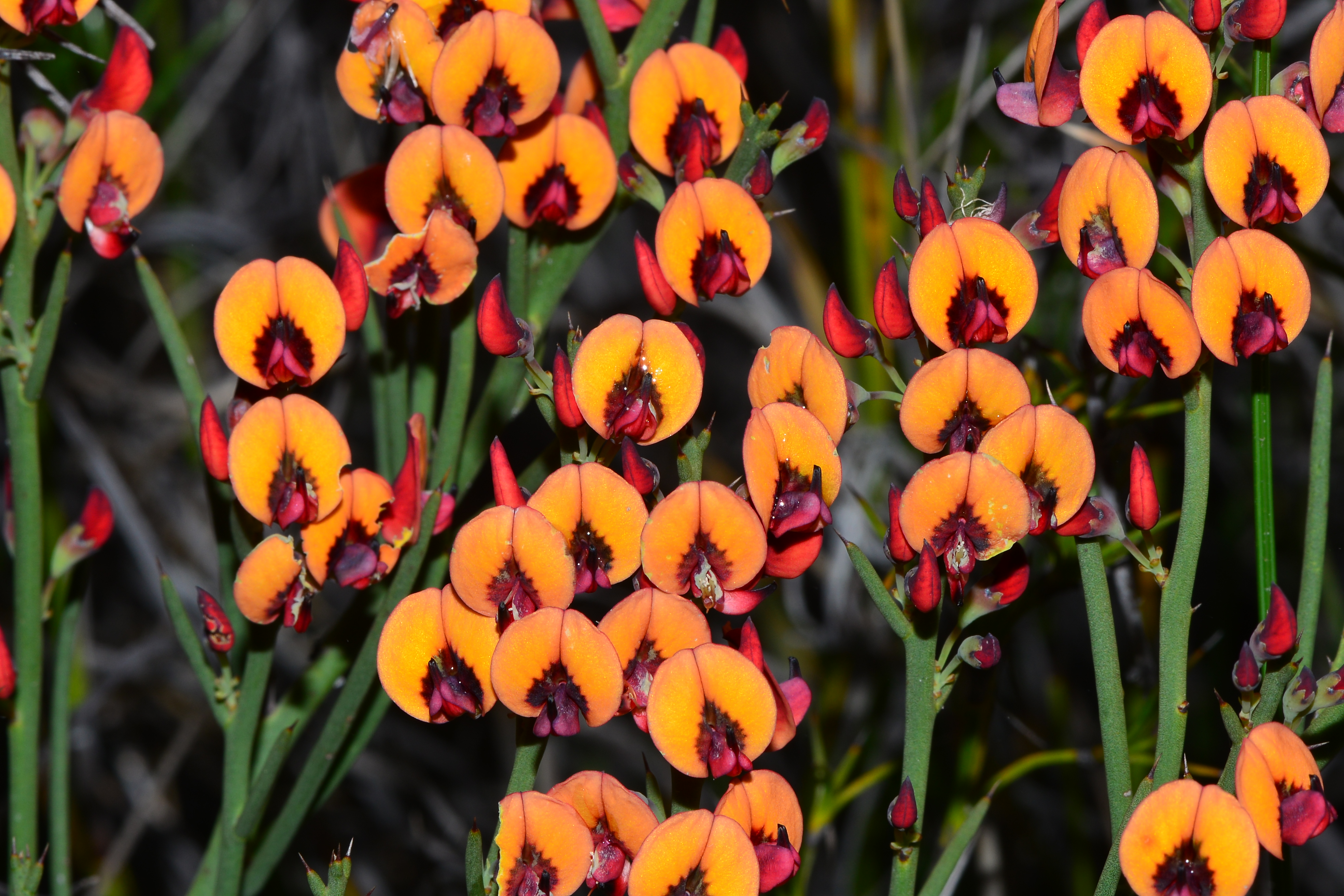
- In Wandoo National Park

Scientific classification
- Kingdom: Plantae
- Clade: Tracheophytes
- Clade: Angiosperms
- Clade: Eudicots
- Clade: Rosids
- Order: Fabales
- Family: Fabaceae
- Subfamily: Faboideae
- Genus: Daviesia
- Species: D. incrassata

Binomial name
- Daviesia incrassata Sm.

= Daviesia incrassata =

Species of flowering plant

Daviesia incrassata is a species of flowering plant in the family Fabaceae and is endemic to the south-west of Western Australia. It is an erect, mounded to spreading shrub with more or less zigzag branchlets, scattered needle-shaped phyllodes and orange, deep red and pink flowers.

== Description ==
Daviesia incrassata is an erect, mounded to spreading, glabrous shrub that typically grows to a height of up to 1 m (3 ft 3 in), and has more or less zigzag branchlets. Its phyllodes are scattered, needle-shaped or triangular in cross-section and 5–15 mm (0.20–0.59 in) long. The flowers are arranged in groups of two to four in leaf axils, each flower on a pedicel 2.0–4.5 mm (0.079–0.177 in) long with oblong bracts 1.5–2.0 mm (0.059–0.079 in) long at the base, the rachis 0.25–2 mm (0.0098–0.0787 in) long. The sepals are 2.5–3.0 mm (0.098–0.118 in) long and joined at the base, the upper two lobes joined for most of their length and the lower three 0.5–1.0 mm (0.020–0.039 in) long. The standard petal is elliptic to egg-shaped, 7–8 mm (0.28–0.31 in) long and orange with a reddish-brown base, the wings 6.0–7.5 mm (0.24–0.30 in) long and deep pink, and the keel 7.0–7.5 mm (0.28–0.30 in) long and pink with a blackish tip. Flowering occurs from June to November and the fruit is an inflated triangular pod 11–14 mm (0.43–0.55 in) long.

== Taxonomy and naming ==
Daviesia incrassata was first formally described in 1808 by James Edward Smith in The Cyclopaedia from specimens collected at King George Sound by Archibald Menzies. The specific epithet (incrassata) means "flattened", referring to the phyllodes.

In 1995, Michael Crisp described three subspecies in Australian Systematic Botany and the names are accepted by the Australian Plant Census:

- Daviesia incrassata Sm. subsp. incrassata;
- Daviesia incrassata subsp. reversifolia Crisp is distinguished from the autonym by its tangled habit, zigzag branchlets and spreading to strongly down-turned phyllodes;
- Daviesia incrassata subsp. teres Crisp differs from the autonym and subsp. reversifolia by its needle-shaped branchlets and phyllodes that do not turn downwards.

== Distribution and habitat ==
This daviesia is widespread in the south-west of Western Australia, from near Dongara in the north-west to the Cape Arid National Park in the south-east. Subspecies incrassata grows in heath, woodland and forest, in sandy or swampy places, subsp. reversifolia in heath in near-coastal areas between Bremer Bay and Esperance and subsp. teres in heath or near saltpans between Mullewa, Morawa, Mogumber Lake Grace and Kulin.

== Conservation status ==
All three subspecies of D. incrassata are listed as "not threatened" by the Government of Western Australia Department of Biodiversity, Conservation and Attractions.
