= List of Ricinulei species =

This is a list of the described species of Ricinulei (hooded tickspiders). The data is taken from the World Ricinulei Catalog.

== Ricinoididae ==
- Cryptocellus Westwood, 1874

- Cryptocellus abaporu Bonaldo & Pinto-da-Rocha, 2003 — Brazil
- Cryptocellus adisi Platnick, 1988 — Brazil
- Cryptocellus albosquamatus Cooke, 1967 — Guyana
- Cryptocellus becki Platnick & Shadab, 1977 — Brazil
- Cryptocellus bocas Platnick & Shadab, 1981 — Panama
- Cryptocellus bordoni (Dumitresco & Juvara-balş, 1977) — Venezuela
- Cryptocellus brignolii Cokendolpher, 2000 — Suriname
- Cryptocellus centralis Fage, 1921 — Costa Rica
- Cryptocellus chimaera Botero-Trujillo & Valdez-Mondragón, 2016 – Ecuador
- Cryptocellus chiriqui Platnick & Shadab, 1981 — Costa Rica, Panama
- Cryptocellus conori Tourinho & Saturnino, 2010 — Brazil
- Cryptocellus fagei Cooke & Shadab, 1973 — Costa Rica
- Cryptocellus florezi Platnick & García, 2008 — Colombia
- Cryptocellus foedus Westwood, 1874 — Brazil
- Cryptocellus gamboa Platnick & Shadab, 1981 — Panama
- Cryptocellus glenoides Cooke & Shadab, 1973 — Colombia
- Cryptocellus goodnighti Platnick & Shadab, 1981 — Costa Rica
- Cryptocellus hanseni Cooke & Shadab, 1973 — Honduras, Nicaragua
- Cryptocellus iaci Tourinho, Man-Hung & Bonaldo, 2010 — Brazil
- Cryptocellus icamiabas Tourinho & de Azevedo, 2007 — Brazil
- Cryptocellus isthmius Cooke & Shadab, 1973 — Panama
- Cryptocellus lampeli Cooke, 1967 — Guyana
- Cryptocellus lisbethae González-Sponga, 1998 — Venezuela
- Cryptocellus luisedieri Botero-Trujillo & Pérez, 2009 — Colombia
- Cryptocellus magnus Ewing, 1929 — Colombia
- Cryptocellus muiraquitan Tourinho, Lo-Man-Hung & Salvatierra, 2014 — Brazil
- Cryptocellus narino Platnick & Paz, 1979 — Colombia
- Cryptocellus osa Platnick & Shadab, 1981 — Costa Rica
- Cryptocellus peckorum Platnick & Shadab, 1977 — Colombia
- Cryptocellus platnicki Botero-Trujillo & Pérez, 2008 — Colombia
- Cryptocellus pseudocellatus Roewer, 1952 — Peru
- Cryptocellus simonis Hansen & Sørensen, 1904 — Brazil
- Cryptocellus sofiae Botero-Trujillo, 2014 — Colombia
- Cryptocellus striatipes Cooke & Shadab, 1973 — Costa Rica
- Cryptocellus tarsilae Pinto-da-Rocha & Bonaldo, 2007 — Brazil
- Cryptocellus verde Platnick & Shadab, 1981 — Costa Rica
- Cryptocellus whitticki Platnick & Shadab, 1977 — Guyana

- Pseudocellus Platnick, 1980

- Pseudocellus abeli Armas, 2017 — Cuba
- Pseudocellus alux Armas & Agreda, 2016 — Guatemala
- Pseudocellus barberi (Ewing, 1929) — Guatemala, Honduras (nomen dubium)
- Pseudocellus blesti (Merrett, 1960) — Panama
- Pseudocellus bolivari Gertsch, 1971 — Mexico
- Pseudocellus boneti (Bolívar y Pieltain, 1942) — Mexico
- Pseudocellus chankin Valdez-Mondragón & Francke, 2011 — Mexico
- Pseudocellus cookei (Gertsch, 1977) — Guatemala
- Pseudocellus cruzlopezi Valdez-Mondragón & Francke, 2013 — Mexico
- Pseudocellus cubanicus (Dumitresco & Juvara-balş, 1973) — Cuba
- Pseudocellus dissimulans (Cooke & Shadab, 1973) — El Salvador
- Pseudocellus dorotheae (Gertsch & Mulaik, 1939) — US
- Pseudocellus gertschi (Márquez & Conconi, 1974) — Mexico
- Pseudocellus ignotus Armas, 2017 — Cuba
- Pseudocellus jarocho Valdez-Mondragón & Francke, 2011 — Mexico
- Pseudocellus krejcae Cokendolpher & Enríquez, 2004 — Belize
- Pseudocellus mayari (Armas, 1977) — Cuba
- Pseudocellus mitchelli Gertsch, 1971 — Mexico
- Pseudocellus monjarazi Valdez-Mondragón & Francke, 2013 — Mexico
- Pseudocellus osorioi (Bolívar y Pieltain, 1946) — Mexico
- Pseudocellus oztotl Valdez-Mondragón & Francke, 2011 — Mexico
- Pseudocellus pachysoma Teruel & Armas, 2008 — Cuba
- Pseudocellus paradoxus (Cooke, 1972) — Cuba
- Pseudocellus pearsei (Chamberlin & Ivie, 1938) — Mexico
- Pseudocellus pelaezi (Coronado Gutierrez, 1970) — Mexico
- Pseudocellus permagnus Armas, 2017 — Cuba
- Pseudocellus platnicki Valdez-Mondragón & Francke, 2011 — Mexico
- Pseudocellus reddelli (Gertsch, 1971) — Mexico
- Pseudocellus relictus (Chamberlin & Ivie, 1938) — Panama
- Pseudocellus sbordonii (Brignoli, 1974) — Mexico
- Pseudocellus seacus Platnick & Pass, 1982 — Guatemala
- Pseudocellus silvai (Armas, 1977) — Cuba
- Pseudocellus spinotibialis (Goodnight & Goodnight, 1952) — Mexico
- Pseudocellus undatus Armas, 2017 — Cuba
- Pseudocellus valerdii Valdez-Mondragón & Juárez-Sánchez, 2021 — Mexico

- Ricinoides Ewing, 1929

- Ricinoides afzelii (Thorell, 1892) – Ghana, Guinea, Sierra Leone
- Ricinoides atewa Naskrecki, 2008 – Ghana
- Ricinoides crassipalpe (Hansen & Sørensen, 1904) – Cameroon, Equatorial Guinea
- Ricinoides feae (Hansen, 1921) – Guinea, Guinea-Bissau
- Ricinoides hanseni Legg, 1976 – Sierra Leone
- Ricinoides karschii (Hansen & Sørensen, 1904) – Cameroon, Congo, Gabon
- Ricinoides leonensis Legg, 1978 – Sierra Leone
- Ricinoides megahanseni Legg, 1982 – Côte d’Ivoire
- Ricinoides olounoua Legg, 1978 – Cameroon
- Ricinoides sjostedtii (Hansen & Sørensen, 1904) – Cameroon, Nigeria
- Ricinoides westermannii (Guérin-Méneville, 1838) – Côte d’Ivoire, Ghana, Togo

== Fossil species ==
While no fossil species of Ricinoididae are known, the other two described families are only known from the Pennsylvanian, about 300 mya.

=== Curculioididae ===
- †Amarixys Selden, 1992

- †Amarixys gracilis (Petrunkevitch, 1945)
- †Amarixys stellaris Selden, 1992
- †Amarixys sulcata (Melander, 1903)

- †Curculioides Buckland, 1837

- †Curculioides adompha Brauckmann, 1987
- †Curculioides ansticii Buckland, 1837
- †Curculioides eltringhami Petrunkevitch, 1949
- †Curculioides gigas Selden, 1992
- †Curculioides granulatus Petrunkevitch, 1949
- †Curculioides mcluckiei Selden, 1992
- †Curculioides pococki Selden, 1992
- †Curculioides scaber (Scudder, 1890)

=== Poliocheridae ===
- †Poliochera Scudder, 1884

- †Poliochera cretacea Wunderlich, 2012
- †Poliochera gibbsi Selden, 1992
- †Poliochera glabra Petrunkevitch, 1913
- †Poliochera punctulata Scudder, 1884

- †Terpsicroton Selden, 1992

- †Terpsicroton alticeps (Pocock, 1911)

=== Primoricinuleidae ===
- †Primoricinuleus Wunderlich, 2015

- †Primoricinuleus pugio Wunderlich, 2015

=== Sigillaricinuleidae ===
- †Sigillaricinuleus Wunderlich, 2022

- †Sigillaricinuleus tripares Wunderlich, 2022
