= Chelae =

Pincer-like organ terminating certain limbs of some arthropods

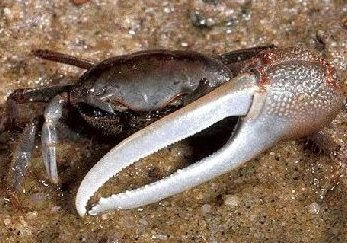
Fiddler crabs like Minuca pugnax, and other members of the family Ocypodidae, have chelae of different sizes: a large left chela and a small right chela.

A chela (/ˈkiːlə/) – also called a claw, nipper, or pincer – is a pincer-shaped organ at the end of certain limbs of some arthropods. The name comes from Ancient Greek χηλή (khēlḗ), through Neo-Latin chela. The plural form is chelae. Another common name is claw because most chelae are curved and have a sharp point like a claw.

Arthropod chela mechanics

A chela is formed by the modification of at least two distal segments (podomeres). The terminal segment is a mobile claw-like unit to open or close the chela, referred to as the movable finger or free finger. The basal segment, which houses muscles to move the movable finger, bears a claw-like protrusion called the fixed finger that faces toward the retracting (closing) direction of the movable finger, where both fingers contact and work together as a pincer-like structure. Appendages with a chela are termed chelate or cheliform.

Terminal podomeres which fold back towards the previous podomere may be called a "subchela" (subchelate). This includes the raptorial front legs of the mantis, the grasping claws of lice, and some chelicerae such as spider fangs.

== In crustaceans ==
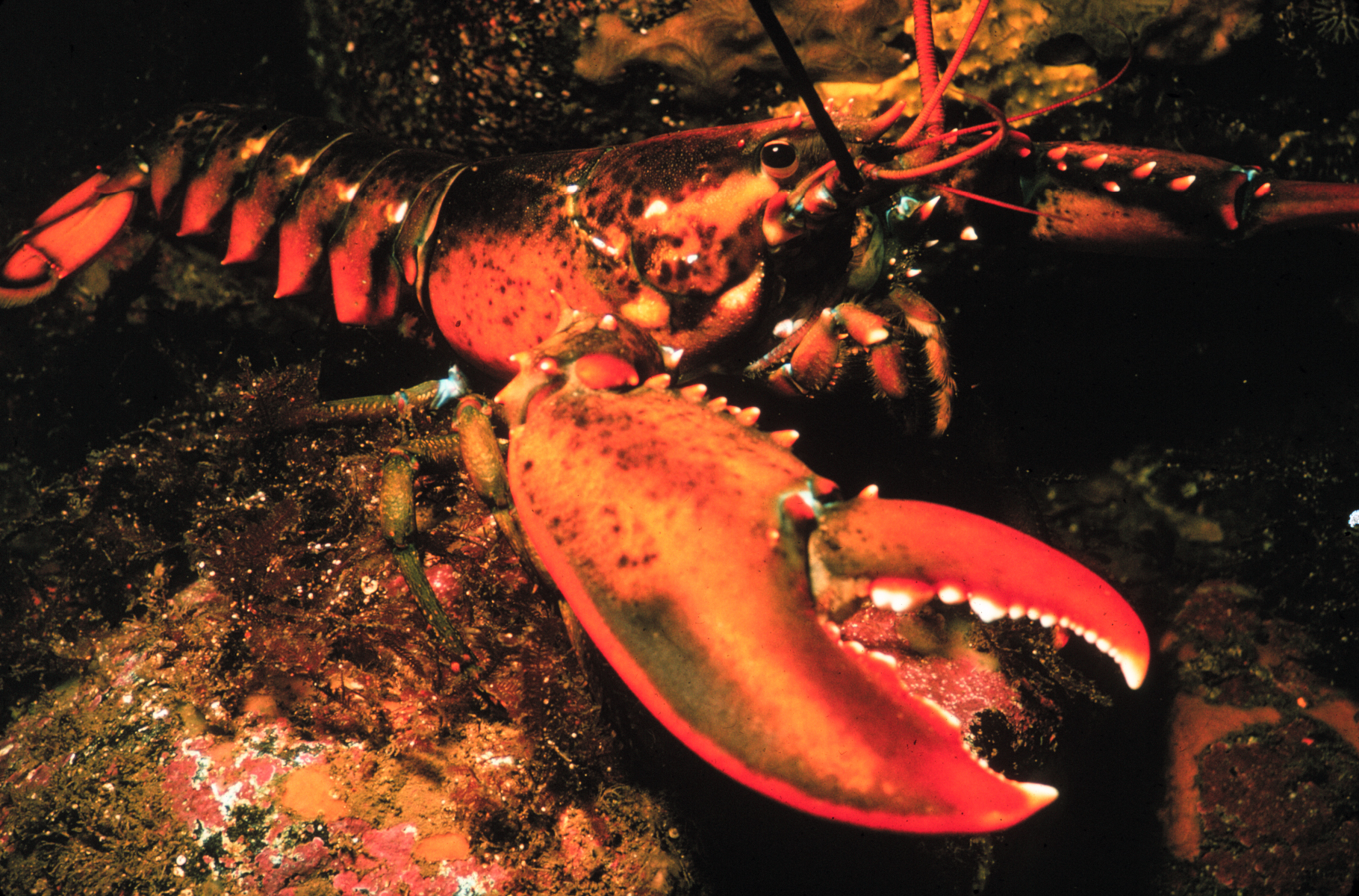
Lobster such as Homarus americanus have prominent chelipeds.

Chelae are common amongst Decapoda, a group which include familiar crustaceans like crabs, lobsters, shrimps and prawns. Legs (thoracopods) with chela are called chelipeds. Astacidea (crayfish and true lobster) and Dendrobranchiata (true prawn) have three pairs, Caridea (true shrimp) have two pairs, while Brachyura (true crabs) and Anomura (hermit crabs and relatives) usually have only one pair on their front legs. Polychelida have four or all five pairs of their legs ended with chelae. Achelata (spiny lobsters and slipper lobsters) is the only group of decapods that doesn't have chelae, although females may have tiny chelae on their hind legs. Shrimps of the genus Psalidopus bearing an exceptional pair of scissor-like chelae that both fingers are mobile, with one of them possibly modified from an originally fixed finger.

Outside of decapods, other crustaceans known to have chelae are tanaids, some amphiopods, pennellid copepods (on antennae) and Pleomothra remipedes (on mouthparts).

== In chelicerates ==
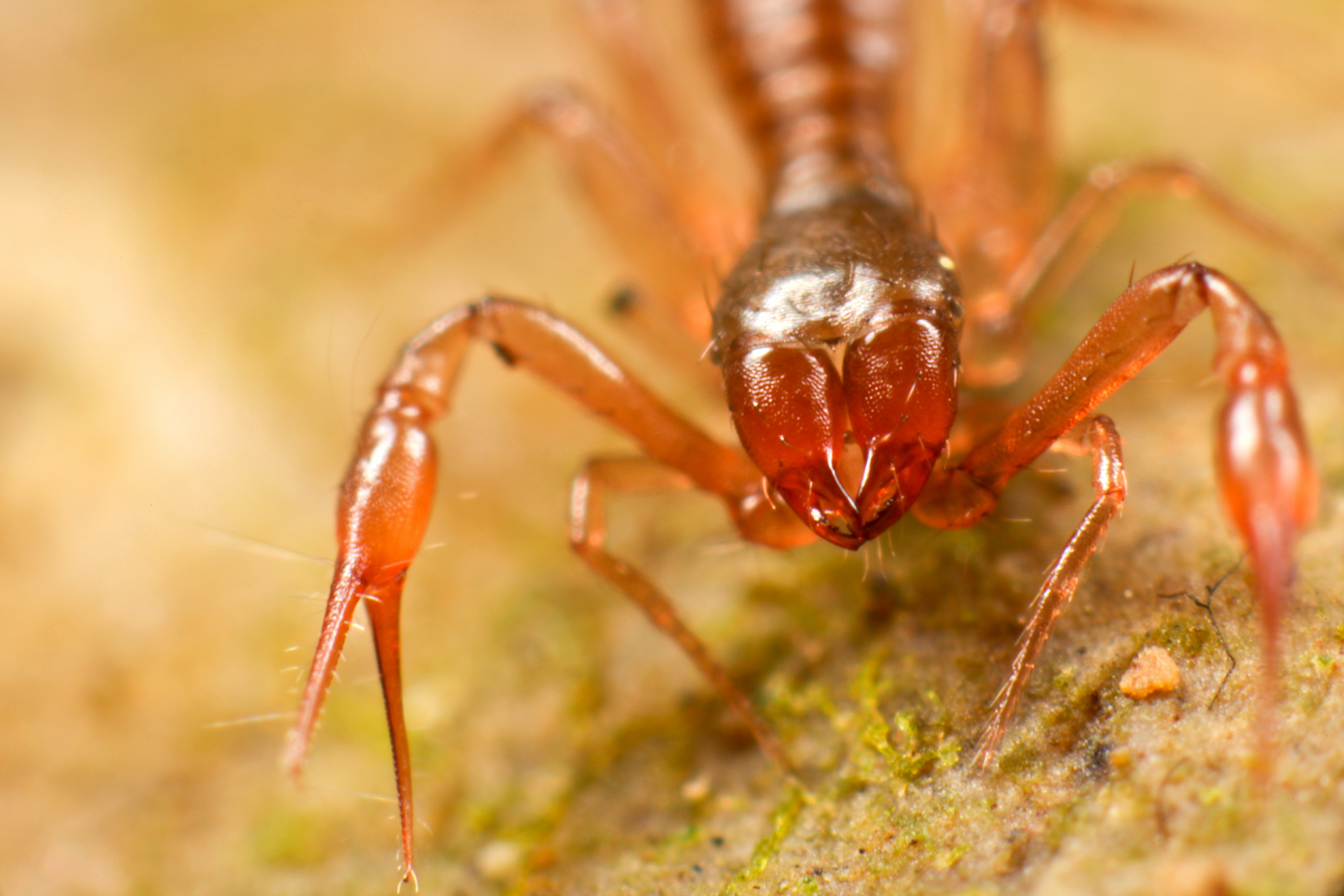
Front view of a pseudoscorpion, showing pincer-like chelicerae (middle) and pedipalps (sides)

Chelae are also common amongst chelicerates, especially at their name-giving first appendages known as chelicerae. While these feeding appendages are usually small, some taxa such as pterygotids and solifugids have exceptionally large chelicerae. In tetrapulmonate arachnids, however, the chelicerae are modified into a pair of subchelate, jackknife-like structure, which function as venomous fangs in most spiders.

Scorpions and pseudoscorpions have their pedipalps (second appendages of chelicerates) modified into a pair of prominent chelae. Ricinuleids also have tiny chelae at the end of their hidden pedipalps. In horseshoe crabs and offacolids, almost all of the legs are also terminated with chelae.

== In other arthropods ==
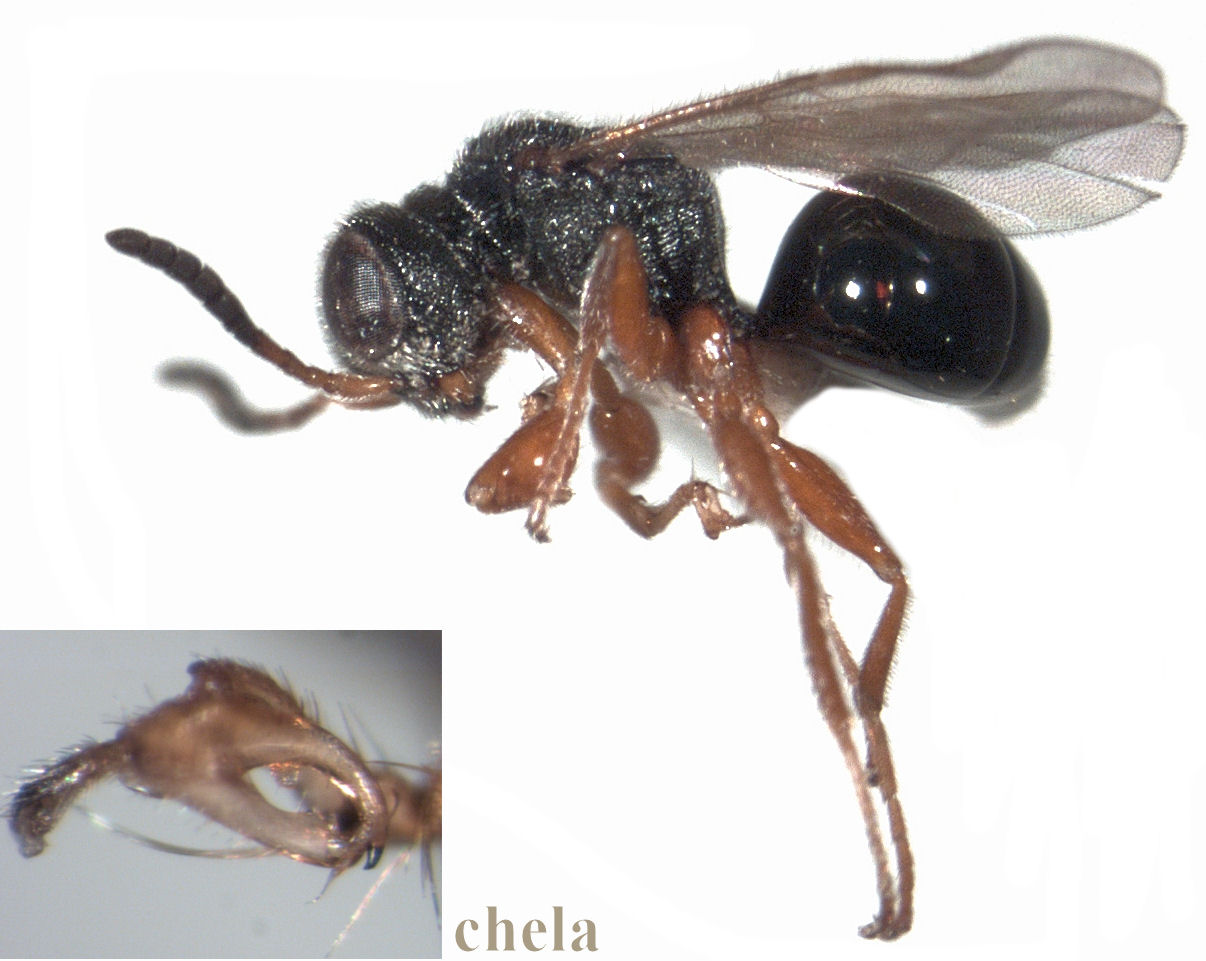
Bocchus thorpei, a dryinid wasp

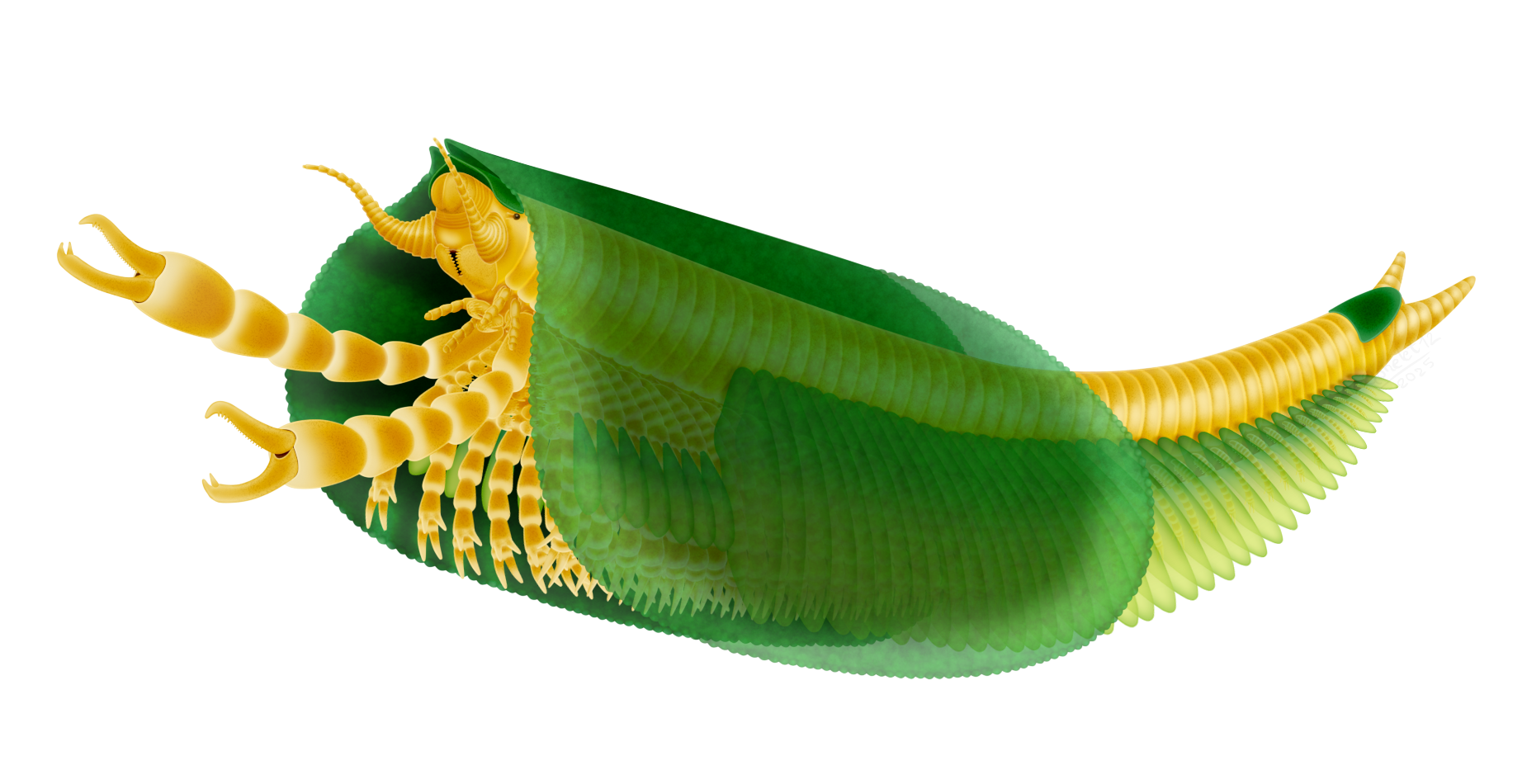
Restoration of the Cambrian arthropod Tokummia, one of the oldest arthropods to bear chelae

Chelae are rare outside of crustaceans and chelicerates. The sphaerotheriid millipede is the only myriapod that bears chelae, which is located on their posterior telopods (mating appendages). While subchelate limbs are common among insects, there are only four insect lineages that evolved true chelae: Carcinocorini (assassin bug), female Dryinidae (parasitic wasp), female Carcinothrips (thrips), and Carcinonepa (water bug); all occur on the front legs.

The extinct Cambrian hymenocarine genus Tokummia is one of the earliest arthropods known to have true chelae. While similar structures occurred in megacheiran great appendages, these are formed by three or four segments/fingers, similar to vinegaroon grasping pedipalps. These multi-segmented chelae are termed "multi-chelate."

== Uses ==
Chelae have a wide variety of uses, but are most commonlyused for handling prey and for defense. These uses are often reflected in the morphology of the chelae. Some species, such as the members of the families Ocypodidae and Alpheidae show asymmetry between their paired claws, possessing one enlarged chela used for defensive and courtship purposes and a smaller chela for shearing and feeding. For some species, this asymmetry between chelae may be a sexually dimorphic trait, whereas in others, like many species of scorpions, it is not. An example of specialization of these asymmetrical chelae can be seen in the Alpheus heterochaelis, the bigclaw snapping shrimp. The enlarged snapping claws of these shrimp are capable of snapping shut with such force to shoot a jet of water and create a loud popping noise, which they use to deter predators and other members of their species.

In scorpion species, the chelae are often used to grab hold of prey and then inject them with venom from their stingers, although some species rely solely on the chelae to subdue their prey. Scorpions also use their chelae for defense by using them to shield and protect their bodies. For scorpions, the chelae are formed at the end of the pedipalps and covered in sensory hairs that they use in a similar manner to insect antennae. In some pseudoscorpions, the chelate pedipalps can be venomous.

Further uses of chelae include digging, burrowing, and climbing. Chelae also play an important role in many species' mating rituals, such as to communicate and attract prospective mates, wherein species with asymmetrical chelae use their enlarged chela as a display to attract mates. Chelae are also used in the act of mating, where the male species will often use them to hold onto the female during mating.

== See also ==
- Pincer (tool)
