= Gelastocoris rotundatus =

Scientific classification
- Domain: Eukaryota
- Kingdom: Animalia
- Phylum: Arthropoda
- Class: Insecta
- Order: Hemiptera
- Suborder: Heteroptera
- Family: Gelastocoridae
- Genus: Gelastocoris
- Species: G. rotundatus

Binomial name
- Gelastocoris rotundatus Champion, 1901

Species of true bug

Gelastocoris rotundatus is a species of toad bug in the family Gelastocoridae. It is found in Central America and North America.
