= P. bolivari =

P. bolivari may refer to:

- Phymateus bolivari, a species of grasshopper
- Pseudocellus bolivari, an arachnid species found in Mexico
