= P. cookei =

P. cookei may refer to:

- Phacelia cookei, a plant in the family Boraginaceae, endemic to California
- Plesiadapis cookei, an extinct primate
- Pseudocellus cookei, an arachnid in the family Ricinoididae, native to Guatemala
- Psychotria cookei, a plant in the family Rubiaceae, endemic to French Polynesia
