= P. boneti =

P. boneti may refer to

- Pseudocellus boneti, an arachnid in the family Ricinoididae, native to Mexico
- Pseudoeurycea boneti, a salamander in the family Plethodontidae, native to Mexico
