= Nerthra stygica =

Scientific classification
- Domain: Eukaryota
- Kingdom: Animalia
- Phylum: Arthropoda
- Class: Insecta
- Order: Hemiptera
- Suborder: Heteroptera
- Family: Gelastocoridae
- Genus: Nerthra
- Species: N. stygica

Binomial name
- Nerthra stygica Say, 1832

Species of true bug

Nerthra stygica is a species of toad bug in the family Gelastocoridae. It is found in North America.
