= C. adisi =

C. adisi may refer to:

- Cryptocellus adisi, an arachnid species found in Brazil
- Cutervodesmus adisi, a millipede in the family Fuhrmannodesmidae
