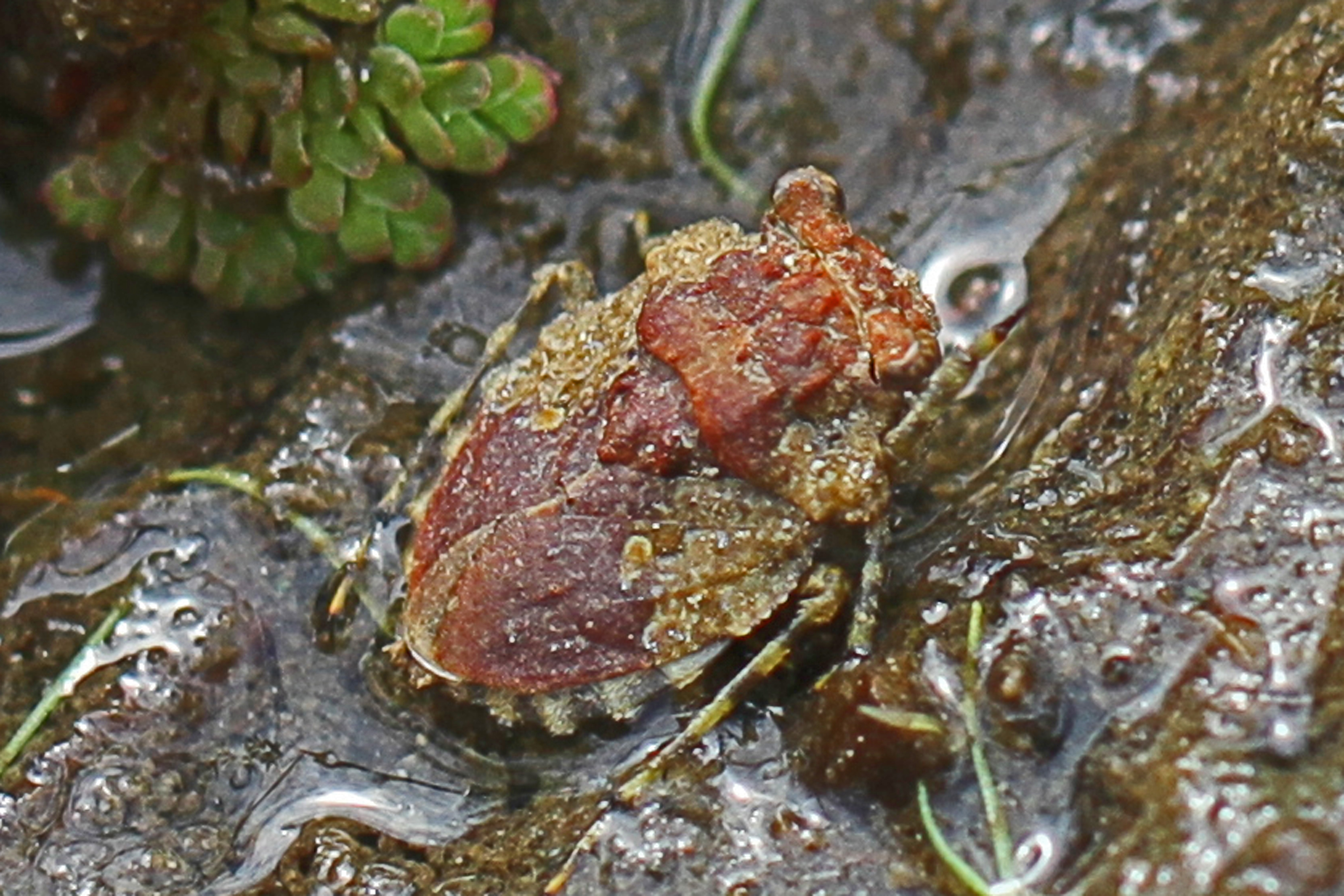

Scientific classification
- Domain: Eukaryota
- Kingdom: Animalia
- Phylum: Arthropoda
- Class: Insecta
- Order: Hemiptera
- Suborder: Heteroptera
- Family: Gelastocoridae
- Genus: Gelastocoris
- Species: G. oculatus

Binomial name
- Gelastocoris oculatus (Fabricius, 1798)

Synonyms
- Naucoris oculata Fabricius, 1798

= Gelastocoris oculatus =

Species of true bug

Gelastocoris oculatus, the big-eyed toad bug, is a species of toad bug in the family Gelastocoridae. It is found in Central America and North America. North of Mexico, it is found in 28 continental United States and 3 provinces of Canada. They are riparian insects that are found near the shores of freshwater lentic and lotic systems. They prefer damp substrates over saturated substrates. Their coloration, morphology, and hopping behavior resembles toads. Toad bugs use their cryptic coloration to blend in with the sand, soil, or pebble-rich substrate of their habitats to avoid predation. They are able to leap many times their body length to avoid predation, and can swim short distances. Both G. oculatus adults and nymphs capture smaller insects by jumping on them, and consume them with their piercing sucking mouthparts. Females lay their eggs under rocks or in sand or mud, and nymphs have 5 instars.

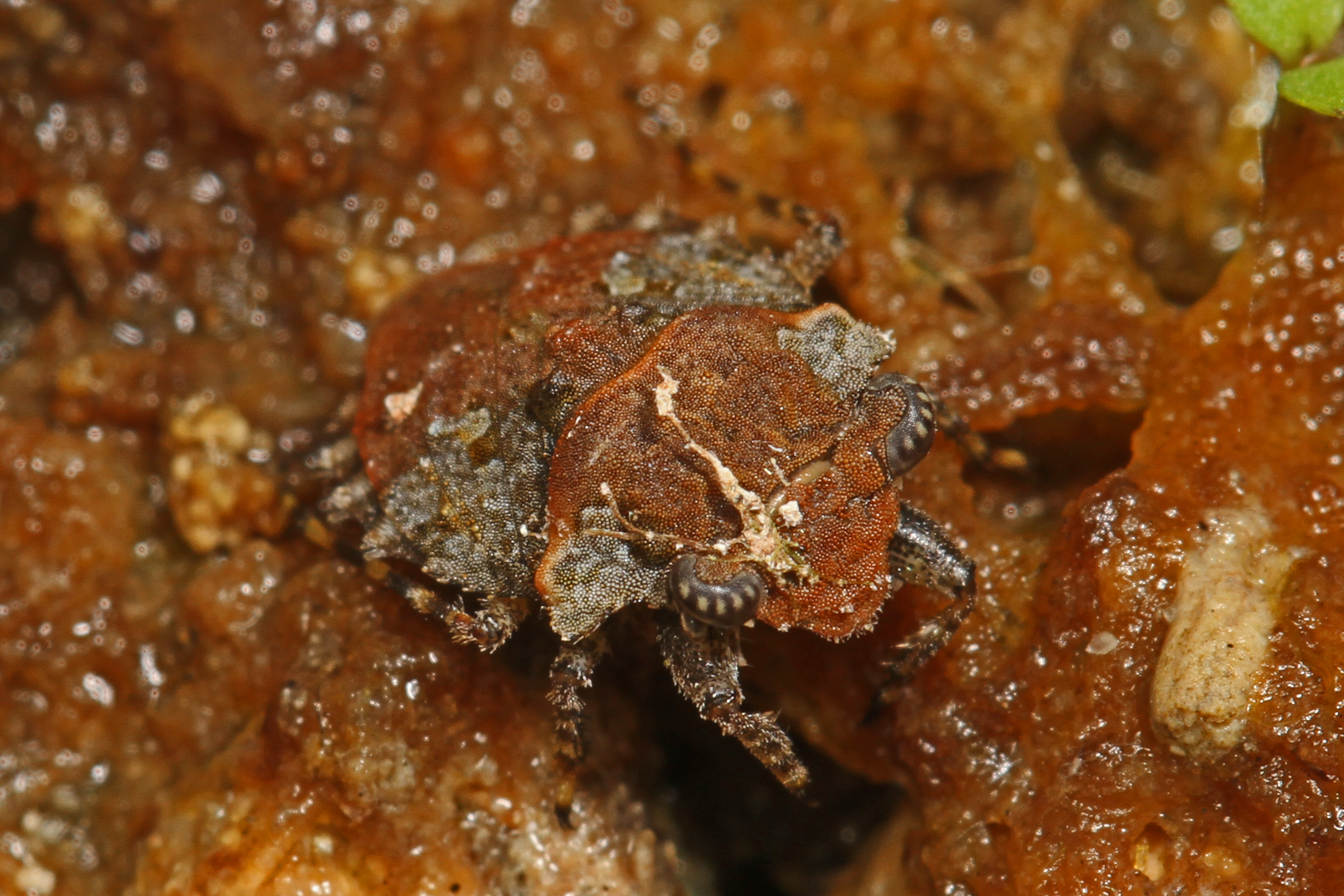
Big-eyed toad bug, Gelastocoris oculatus

They are most active in spring to autumn and those in the northern range hibernate. Adults have been known to congregate sometimes.

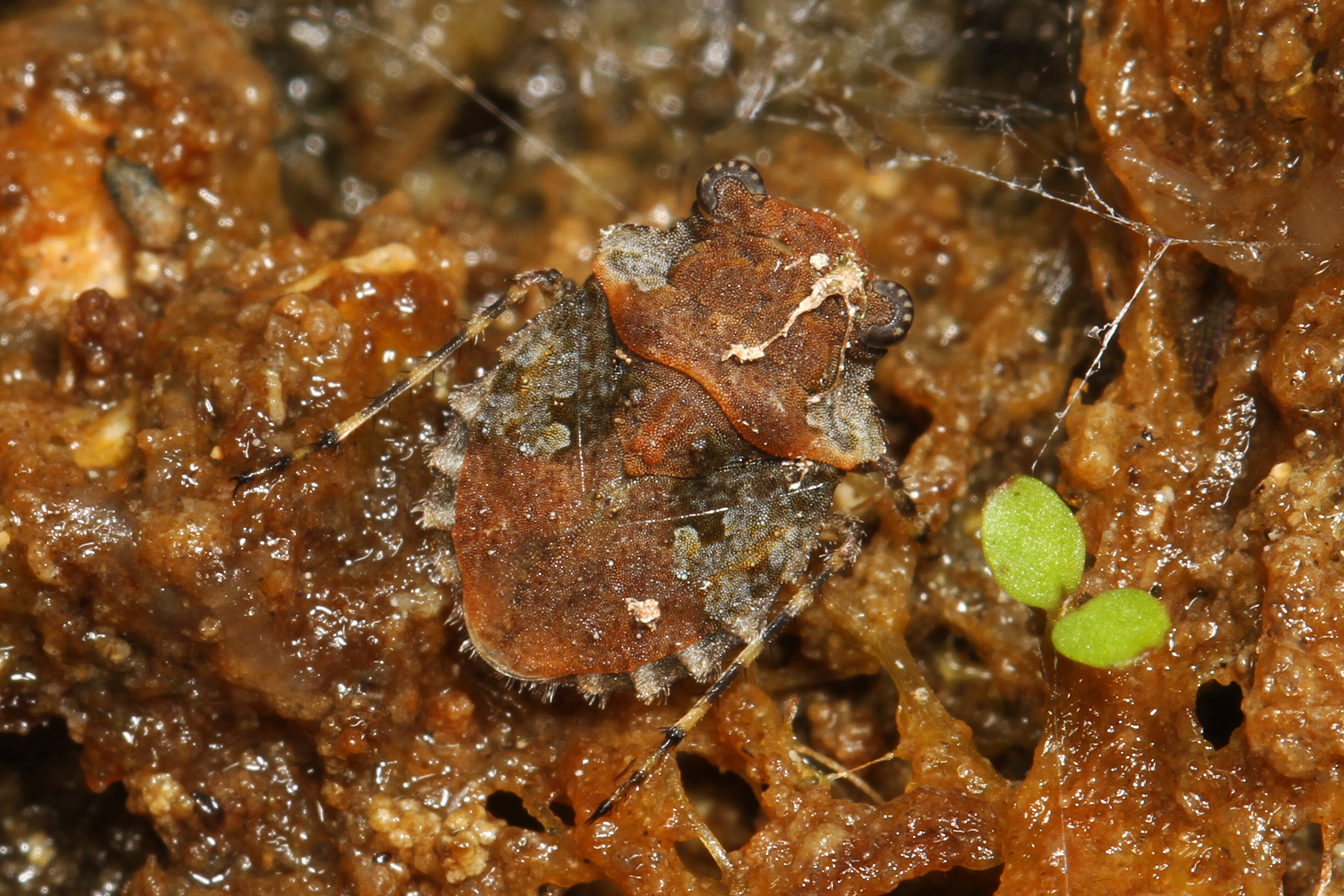
Big-eyed toad bug, Gelastocoris oculatus

== Subspecies ==
These two subspecies belong to the species Gelastocoris oculatus:

- Gelastocoris oculatus oculatus (Fabricius, 1798)
- Gelastocoris oculatus variegatus (Guérin-Méneville, 1844)
