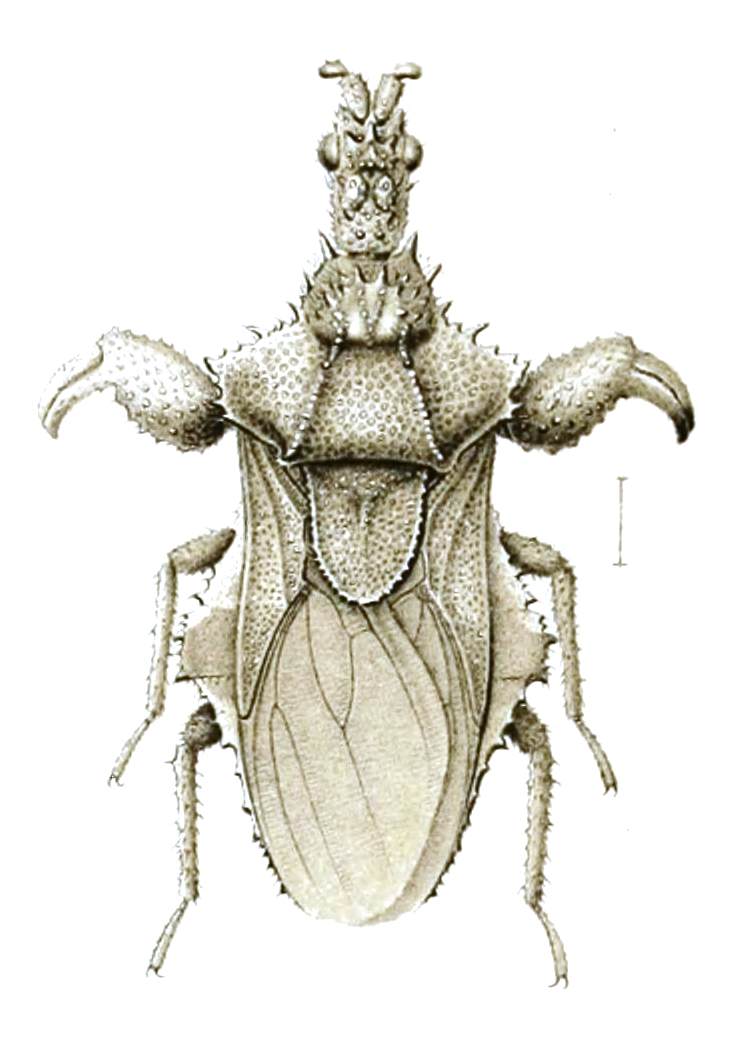
- Carcinochelis alutaceus (male)

Scientific classification
- Kingdom: Animalia
- Phylum: Arthropoda
- Clade: Pancrustacea
- Class: Insecta
- Order: Hemiptera
- Suborder: Heteroptera
- Family: Reduviidae
- Subfamily: Phymatinae
- Tribe: Carcinocorini; Handlirsch, 1897

= Carcinocorini =

Tribe of true bugs

Carcinocorini are a tribe of ambush bugs which are distinct in that they have a pincer-like modification (chelae) of the foreleg used to capture their prey. The name of the tribe is derived from the Greek karkinos for crab and coris for bug.

It is one of the only 4 insect lineages that known to have evolved true chelae, alongside female wasps of the family Dryinidae, female thrips of the genus Carcinothrips, and the fossil waterbug genus Carcinonepa.

== Genera ==
BioLib includes:

1. Carcinochelis Fieber, 1861
2. Carcinocoris Handlirsch, 1897
3. Chelocoris Bianchi, 1899
