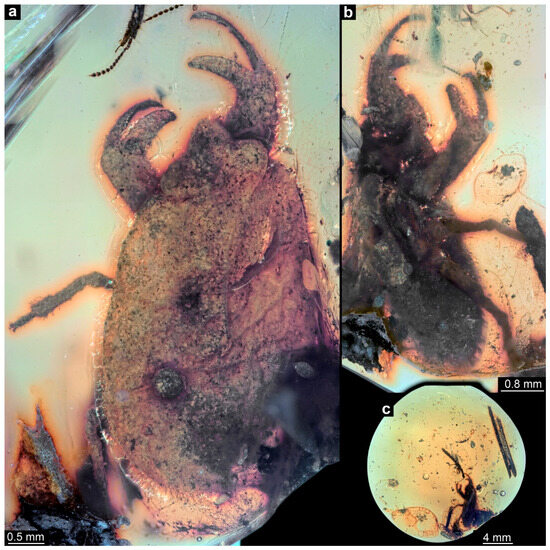
- Fossil specimen
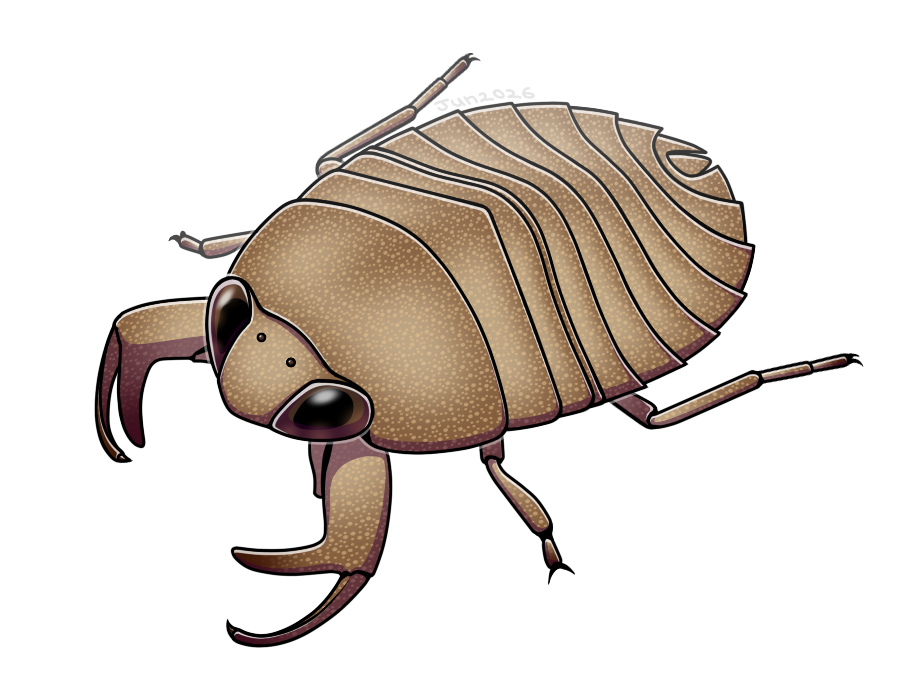
- Reconstruction

Scientific classification
- Kingdom: Animalia
- Phylum: Arthropoda
- Clade: Pancrustacea
- Class: Insecta
- Order: Hemiptera
- Suborder: Heteroptera
- Family: Gelastocoridae (?)
- Genus: †Carcinonepa; Haug et al., 2026
- Species: †C. libererrantes

Binomial name
- †Carcinonepa libererrantes Haug et al., 2026

= Carcinonepa =

Carcinonepa Temporal range: Late Cretaceous, 100 Ma

Genus of true bug

Carcinonepa is a genus of true bug that lived in Myanmar during Late Cretaceous Period. It was found inside an amber that is said to be found in Hukawng Valley, Kachin State. One of its most notable charateristics is the possession of pincer-like appendages (chelae) which rarely evolves in insects.

== Discovery and etymology ==
The amber in which Carcinonepa is preserved was purchased legally from online amber traders along with eight other true bugs in amber, all from 100 million year old Burmese amber from Kachin, Myanmar.

The name of the genus, Carcinonepa, is formed from "carcino" (from Ancient Greek: καρκίνος) in reference to the chelate forelegs of the insect alike those of crabs, and "nepa" (from Latin: nepa) referencing the group to which it is proposed to belong in (Nepomorpha). The specific name "liberrerantes" means "wandering kid", in reference to one of the describers' favourite band, Stray Kids.

== Description ==
Carcinonepa is a small bug (length approximately 5 mm) with a flattened profile. The head has a triangular shape with two bulging eyes protruding from its side. The mouthparts form a distinct but short conical beak. The beak is a characteristic feature of the Hemiptera, and in the conical form it is found in the fossil, is dinstinctively assigned to the Heteroptera, or, more specifically, the Nepomorpha.

The last 3 segments (femur, tibia and tarsus) of the front legs are modified into a pair of pronounced chelae, each formed by a hook-like movable finger and a fixed finger that bends inward at 90 degrees. It is the fourth (and the first fossil) known case of insects having evolved true chelae. The other known cases are female Carcinothrips, female Dryinidae, and the Carcinocorini, which is a small tribe of reduviid Heteroptera.

== Classification ==
While not preserved entirely, several specimens that are recognized as Carcinonepa show that they belong to true bug group specifically Heteroptera. The describer furthermore wrote that Carcinonepa probably is a Nepomorpha that nest inside toad bugs (Gelastocoridae). But for now, describers only confidently describe Carcinonepa as an true bug.
