= Nerthra fuscipes =

Scientific classification
- Kingdom: Animalia
- Phylum: Arthropoda
- Clade: Pancrustacea
- Class: Insecta
- Order: Hemiptera
- Suborder: Heteroptera
- Family: Gelastocoridae
- Genus: Nerthra
- Species: N. fuscipes

Binomial name
- Nerthra fuscipes (Guérin-Méneville, 1843)

Synonyms
- Mononyx badius Melin, 1929; Mononyx obscurus Herrich-Schäffer, 1853

Species of true bug

Nerthra fuscipes is a species of toad bug in the family Gelastocoridae. It is found in the Caribbean, Central America, North America, and South America.
