= Pseudocellus platnicki =

Scientific classification
- Kingdom: Animalia
- Phylum: Arthropoda
- Subphylum: Chelicerata
- Class: Arachnida
- Order: Ricinulei
- Family: Ricinoididae
- Genus: Pseudocellus
- Species: P. platnicki

Binomial name
- Pseudocellus platnicki Valdez-Mondragon & Francke, 2011

Species of spider-like animal

Pseudocellus platnicki is a species of ricinulei classed in the family of Ricinoididae.
