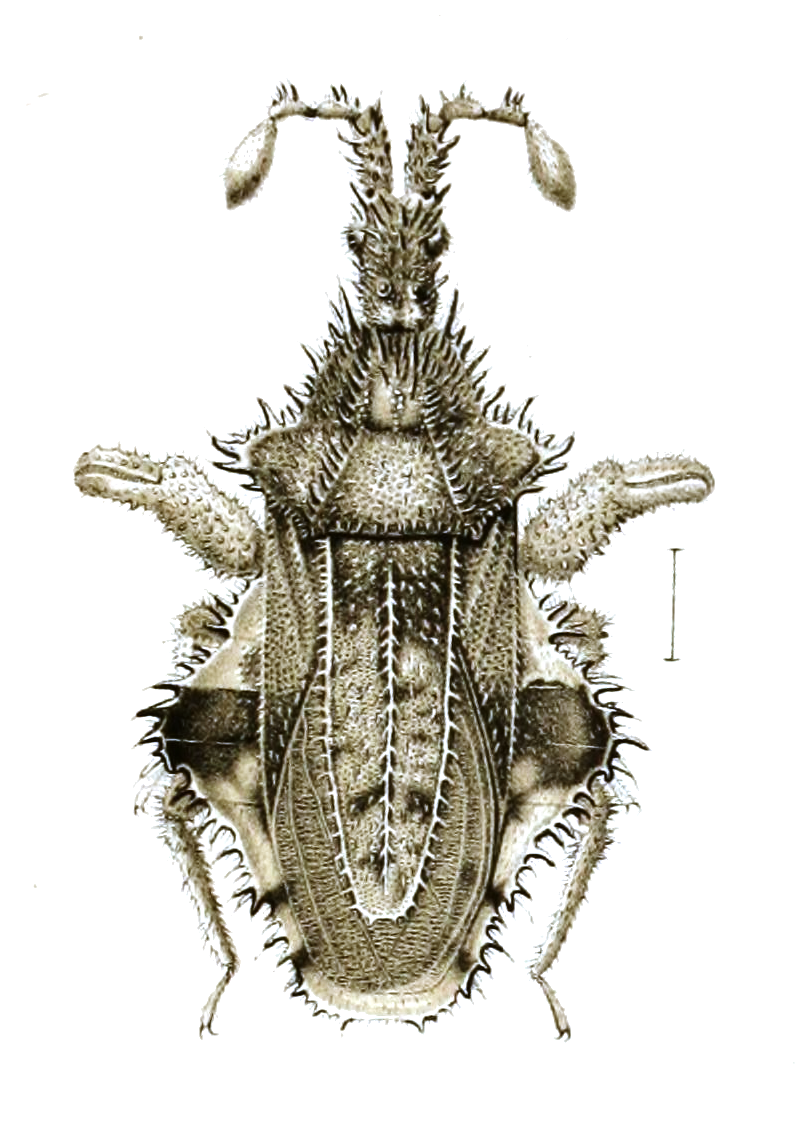
- Original Handlirsch illustration

Scientific classification
- Kingdom: Animalia
- Phylum: Arthropoda
- Class: Insecta
- Order: Hemiptera
- Suborder: Heteroptera
- Family: Reduviidae
- Subfamily: Phymatinae
- Tribe: Carcinocorini
- Genus: Carcinocoris; Handlirsch, 1897

= Carcinocoris =

Genus of true bugs

Carcinocoris is a genus of Asian ambush bugs, erected by Anton Handlirsch in 1897. These insects are typical of the tribe Carcinocorini and like the two other genera are notable in having claw-like modifications to their forelegs for capturing prey. Species have been recorded from southern China and Indochina.

== Species ==
The Global Biodiversity Information Facility lists:

1. Carcinocoris bilineatus Distant, 1903
2. Carcinocoris binghami (Sharp, 1897)
3. Carcinocoris castetsi Handlirsch, 1897
4. Carcinocoris erinaceus Handlirsch, 1897
5. Carcinocoris indicus Dudich, 1922
6. Carcinocoris ochraceus Kormilev, 1962
7. Carcinocoris yunnanus Rabitsch, Cui & Cai, 2006
