= Pseudocellus mitchelli =

Scientific classification
- Domain: Eukaryota
- Kingdom: Animalia
- Phylum: Arthropoda
- Subphylum: Chelicerata
- Class: Arachnida
- Order: Ricinulei
- Family: Ricinoididae
- Genus: Pseudocellus
- Species: P. mitchelli

Binomial name
- Pseudocellus mitchelli (Gertsch, 1971)

Synonyms
- Cryptocellus mitchelli Gertsch, 1971

Species of spider-like animal

Pseudocellus mitchelli is an arachnid species in the order Ricinulei. It is endemic to caves in Durango, Mexico. The specific epithet is a tribute to cave biology specialist Robert W. Mitchell.
