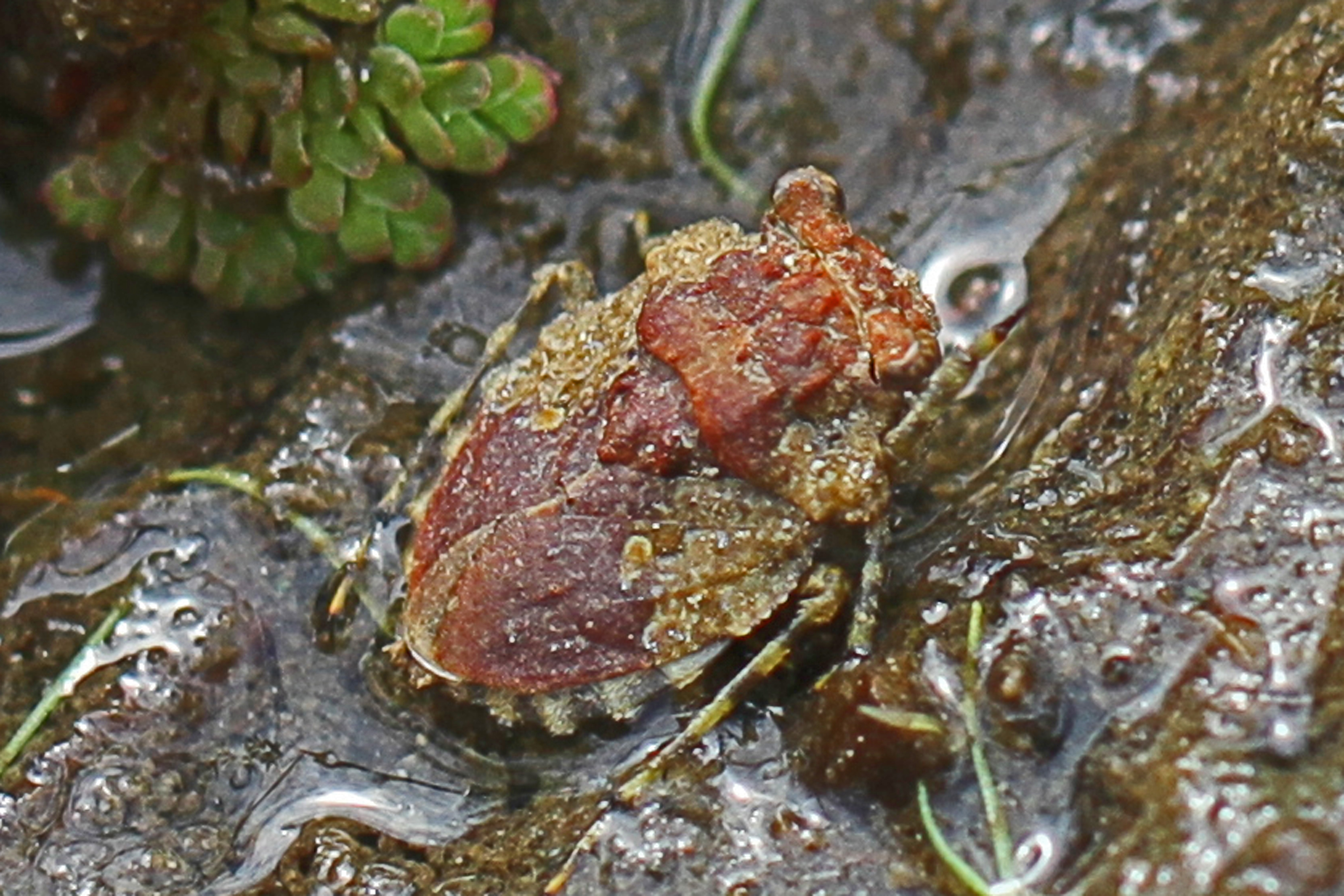
- Gelastocoris oculatus

Scientific classification
- Domain: Eukaryota
- Kingdom: Animalia
- Phylum: Arthropoda
- Class: Insecta
- Order: Hemiptera
- Suborder: Heteroptera
- Family: Gelastocoridae
- Genus: Gelastocoris; Kirkaldy, 1897

= Gelastocoris =

Gelastocoris Temporal range: Cenomanian–Recent

Genus of true bugs

Gelastocoris is a genus of toad bugs in the family Gelastocoridae. There are more than 20 described species in Gelastocoris.

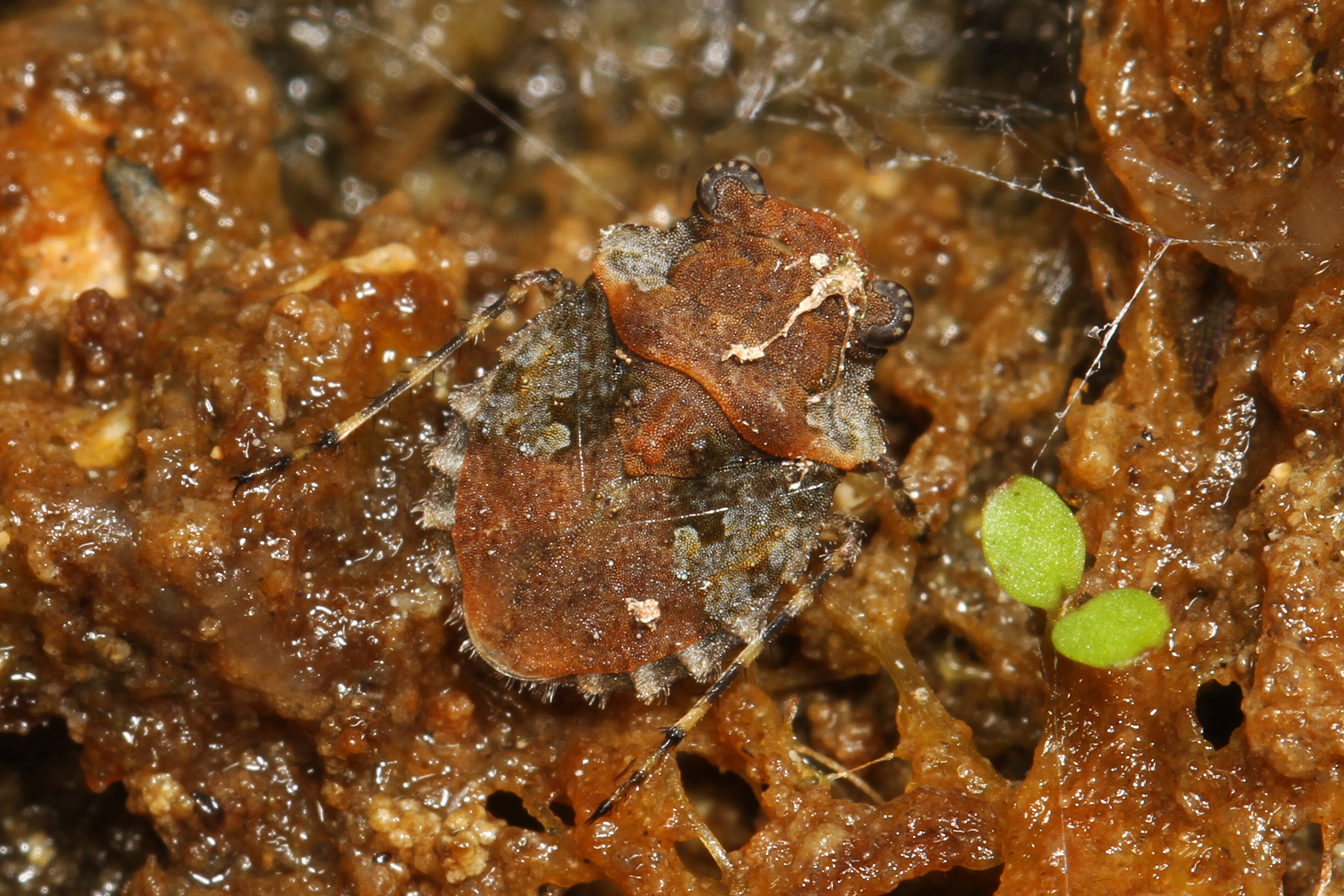
Gelastocoris oculatus

== Species ==
These 23 species belong to the genus Gelastocoris:

- Gelastocoris amazonensis Melin, 1929
- Gelastocoris andinus Melin, 1929
- Gelastocoris apureensis Melin, 1929
- Gelastocoris barberi Torre-Bueno
- Gelastocoris bolivianus De Carlo, 1954
- Gelastocoris bufo (Herrich-Schäffer, 1840)
- Gelastocoris curiosus Poinar & Brown, 2016
- Gelastocoris decarloi Estévez & Schnack, 1977
- Gelastocoris flavus (Guérin-Méneville, 1835)
- Gelastocoris fuscus Martin, 1929
- Gelastocoris hungerfordi Melin, 1929
- Gelastocoris major Montandon, 1910
- Gelastocoris martinezi De Carlo, 1954
- Gelastocoris monrosi De Carlo, 1959
- Gelastocoris nebulosus (Guérin-Méneville, 1844)
- Gelastocoris oculatus (Fabricius, 1798) (big-eyed toad bug)
- Gelastocoris paraguayensis De Carlo, 1954
- Gelastocoris peruensis Melin, 1929
- Gelastocoris quadrimaculatus (Guérin-Méneville, 1844)
- Gelastocoris rotundatus Champion, 1901
- Gelastocoris vandamepompanoni Boulard & Jauffret, 1984
- Gelastocoris vicinus Champion, 1901
- Gelastocoris viridis Todd, 1955

=== Extinct species ===
- †Gelastocoris curiosus Poinar and Brown 2016 Burmese amber, Myanmar, Cenomanian
