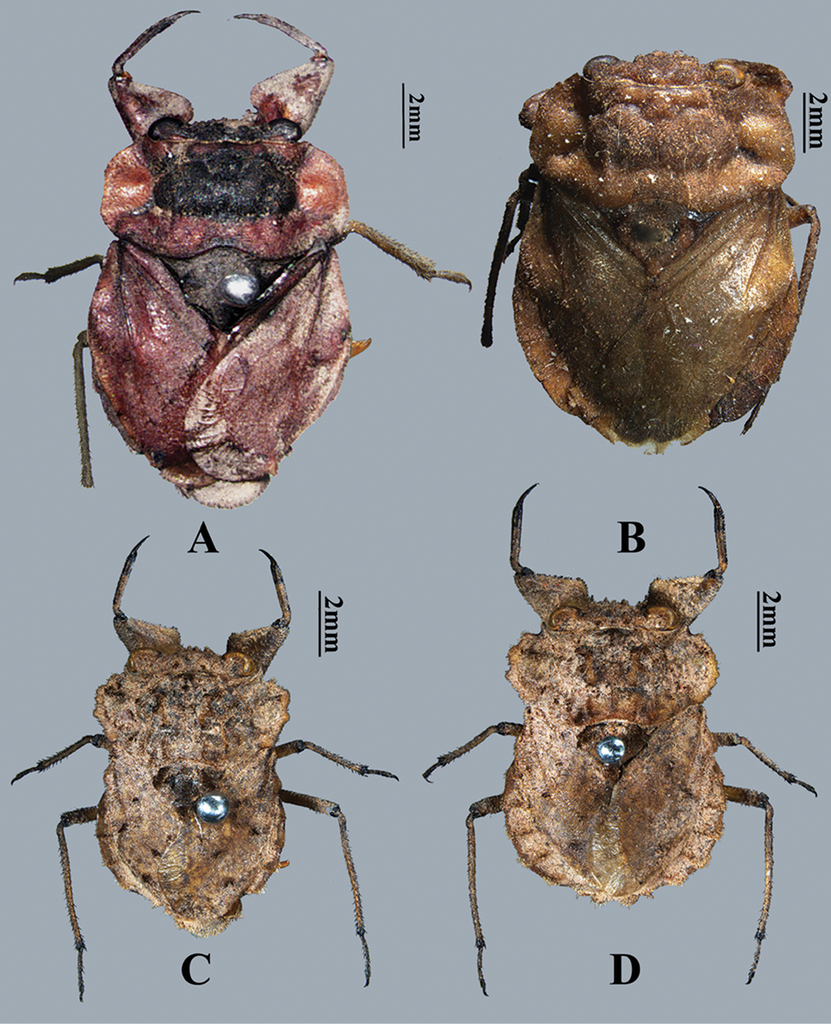
- Nerthra spp.

Scientific classification
- Domain: Eukaryota
- Kingdom: Animalia
- Phylum: Arthropoda
- Class: Insecta
- Order: Hemiptera
- Suborder: Heteroptera
- Family: Gelastocoridae
- Subfamily: Nerthrinae
- Genus: Nerthra; Say, 1832

Synonyms
- Glossoaspis Laporte, 1832; Matinus Guérin-Méneville, 1843; Mononyx Blatchley, 1925; Peltopterus Stål, 1861; Phintius Stål, 1861; Scylaecus Stål, 1861

= Nerthra =

Nerthra Temporal range: Cenomanian–Recent

Genus of true bugs

Nerthra is a genus of toad bugs in the family Gelastocoridae. There are at least 90 described species in Nerthra.

== Species ==
These 95 species belong to the genus Nerthra:

- Nerthra adspersa (Stål, 1863)
- Nerthra alaticollis (Stål, 1854)
- Nerthra americana (Montandon, 1905)
- Nerthra ampliata (Montandon, 1899)
- Nerthra amplicollis (Stål, 1854)
- Nerthra annulipes (Horváth, 1902)
- Nerthra appha Cassis and Silveira, 2001
- Nerthra asiatica (Horváth, 1892)
- Nerthra ater (Melin, 1929)
- Nerthra bichelata Poinar and Brown, 2016
- Nerthra borealis (Melin, 1929)
- Nerthra bracchialis Todd, 1955
- Nerthra buenoi Todd, 1955
- Nerthra cheesmanae Todd, 1959
- Nerthra colaticollis Todd, 1959
- Nerthra conabilis Todd, 1959
- Nerthra corudis Todd, 1955
- Nerthra ecuadorensis (Melin, 1929)
- Nerthra elongata (Montandon, 1900)
- Nerthra eximia Todd, 1957
- Nerthra falcatus Cassis and Silveira, 2002
- Nerthra femoralis (Montandon, 1899)
- Nerthra fuscipes (Guérin-Méneville, 1843)
- Nerthra gaucha Estévez and Schnack, 1980
- Nerthra grandicollis (Germar, 1837)
- Nerthra grandis (Montandon, 1900)
- Nerthra gurneyi Todd, 1955
- Nerthra hamata Todd, 1957
- Nerthra hirsuta Todd, 1955
- Nerthra hirta Todd, 1959
- Nerthra hungerfordi Todd, 1955
- Nerthra hylaea Todd, 1960
- Nerthra improcera Todd, 1959
- Nerthra indica (Atkinson, 1888)
- Nerthra infecta Todd, 1959
- Nerthra kerzhneri Cassis and Silveira, 2006
- Nerthra lata (Montandon, 1899)
- Nerthra laticollis (Guérin-Méneville, 1843)
- Nerthra lobata (Montandon, 1899)
- Nerthra lurida Todd, 1959
- Nerthra luteovaria (Distant, 1904)
- Nerthra macrostyla Todd, 1955
- Nerthra macrothorax (Montrouzier, 1855)
- Nerthra manni Todd, 1955
- Nerthra martini Todd, 1954
- Nerthra mexicana (Melin, 1929)
- Nerthra mixta (Montandon, 1899)
- Nerthra mixtella Todd, 1959
- Nerthra montandoni (Melin, 1929)
- Nerthra monteithi Cassis and Silveira, 2002
- Nerthra monticola Todd, 1959
- Nerthra nepaeformis (Fabricius, 1775)
- Nerthra nervosa (Montandon, 1900)
- Nerthra nieuwenhuisi Todd, 1957
- Nerthra nudata Todd, 1955
- Nerthra occidua Todd, 1959
- Nerthra omani Todd, 1955
- Nerthra parallelus Lansbury, 1988
- Nerthra parvula (Signoret, 1864)
- Nerthra peruviana (Montandon, 1905)
- Nerthra petila Todd, 1959
- Nerthra planifrons (Melin, 1929)
- Nerthra plauta Todd, 1960
- Nerthra polhemi Cassis and Silveira, 2001
- Nerthra praecipua Todd, 1957
- Nerthra probolostyla Todd, 1960
- Nerthra quinquedentata (Melin, 1929)
- Nerthra ranina (Herrich-Schäffer, 1853)
- Nerthra raptoria (Fabricius, 1803)
- Nerthra recta Todd, 1959
- Nerthra robusta Todd, 1955
- Nerthra rugosa (Desjardins, 1837)
- Nerthra serrata (Montandon, 1897)
- Nerthra sinuosa Todd, 1955
- Nerthra soliquetra Todd, 1960
- Nerthra spangleri Polhemus, 1972
- Nerthra spissa (Distant, 1906)
- Nerthra stali (Montandon, 1900)
- Nerthra stygica Say, 1832
- Nerthra subantarctica Faúndez and Ashworth, 2015
- Nerthra suberosa (Erichson, 1842)
- Nerthra tasmaniensis Todd, 1955
- Nerthra tenebrosa Todd, 1955
- Nerthra tenuistyla Todd, 1959
- Nerthra terrestris (Kevan, 1948)
- Nerthra toddi Polhemus and Lindskog, 1994
- Nerthra toxopeusi Todd, 1959
- Nerthra tuberculata (Montandon, 1899)
- Nerthra turgidula (Distant, 1906)
- Nerthra undosa Nieser and Chen, 1992
- Nerthra unguistyla Todd, 1957
- Nerthra unicornis (Melin, 1929)
- Nerthra usingeri Todd, 1954
- Nerthra walkeri Todd, 1955
- Nerthra williamsi Todd, 1955

=== Fossil species ===
†Nerthra bichelata Poinar and Brown 2016 Burmese amber, Myanmar, Cenomanian
