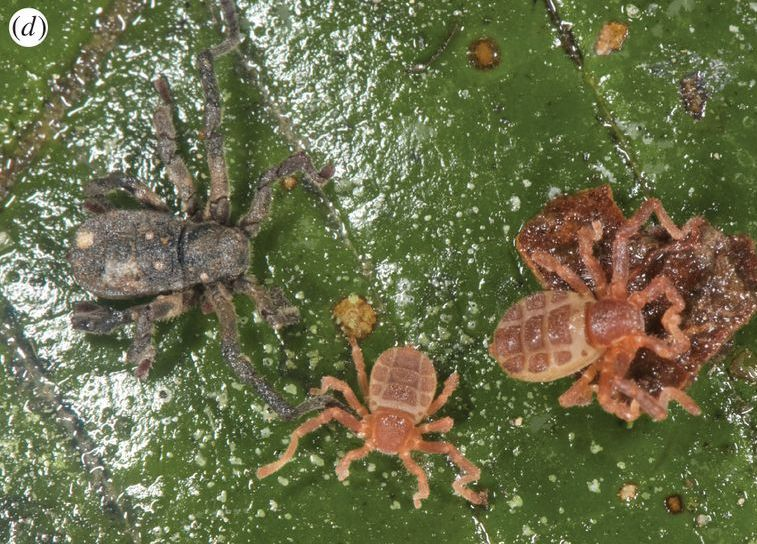

Scientific classification
- Kingdom: Animalia
- Phylum: Arthropoda
- Subphylum: Chelicerata
- Class: Arachnida
- Order: Ricinulei
- Family: Ricinoididae
- Genus: Cryptocellus
- Species: C. becki

Binomial name
- Cryptocellus becki Platnick & Shadab, 1977

= Cryptocellus becki =

Species of spider-like animal

Cryptocellus becki is an arachnid species in the genus Cryptocellus. It can be found in the Amazon rainforest.
