= Pseudocellus barberi =

Scientific classification
- Kingdom: Animalia
- Phylum: Arthropoda
- Subphylum: Chelicerata
- Class: Arachnida
- Order: Ricinulei
- Family: Ricinoididae
- Genus: Pseudocellus
- Species: P. barberi

Binomial name
- Pseudocellus barberi (Platnick, 1980)

Synonyms
- Cryptocellus barberi Platnick, 1980

Species of spider-like animal

Pseudocellus barberi is a species of arachnid in the order Ricinulei. They can be found in Guatemala and Honduras. The type specimen was found in Guatemala.
