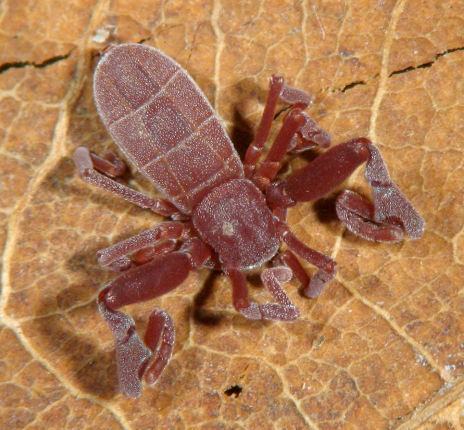
- Pseudocellus bifer male

Scientific classification
- Kingdom: Animalia
- Phylum: Arthropoda
- Subphylum: Chelicerata
- Class: Arachnida
- Order: Ricinulei
- Family: Ricinoididae
- Genus: Pseudocellus; Platnick, 1980

Type species
- Cryptocellus dorotheae Gertsch & Mulaik, 1939

Species
- 41, see text

= Pseudocellus =

Genus of spider-like animals

Pseudocellus is an arachnid genus in the order Ricinulei, first described by Norman Platnick in 1980. It is native to the Neotropics.

== Species ==
As of October 2022 it contains forty-one species:

- Pseudocellus abeli Armas, 2017 — Cuba
- Pseudocellus alux Armas & Agreda, 2016 — Guatemala
- Pseudocellus aridus Teruel, 2015 — Cuba
- Pseudocellus bifer Teruel, 2018 — Cuba
- Pseudocellus barberi (Ewing, 1929) — Guatemala, Honduras (nomen dubium)
- Pseudocellus blesti (Merrett, 1960) — Panama
- Pseudocellus bolivari Gertsch, 1971 — Mexico
- Pseudocellus boneti (Bolívar y Pieltain, 1942) — Mexico
- Pseudocellus chankin Valdez-Mondragón & Francke, 2011 — Mexico
- Pseudocellus cookei (Gertsch, 1977) — Guatemala
- Pseudocellus cruzlopezi Valdez-Mondragón & Francke, 2013 — Mexico
- Pseudocellus cubanicus (Dumitresco & Juvara-balş, 1973) — Cuba
- Pseudocellus dissimilior Teruel, 2018 — Cuba
- Pseudocellus dissimulans (Cooke & Shadab, 1973) — El Salvador
- Pseudocellus dorotheae (Gertsch & Mulaik, 1939) — US
- Pseudocellus franckei Valdez-Mondragón & Cortez-Roldán, 2020 — Mexico
- Pseudocellus gertschi (Márquez & Conconi, 1974) — Mexico
- Pseudocellus giribeti Valdez-Mondragón & Cortez-Roldán, 2021 — Mexico
- Pseudocellus ignotus Armas, 2017 — Cuba
- Pseudocellus jarocho Valdez-Mondragón & Francke, 2011 — Mexico
- Pseudocellus krejcae Cokendolpher & Enríquez, 2004 — Belize
- Pseudocellus mayari (Armas, 1977) — Cuba
- Pseudocellus mitchelli Gertsch, 1971 — Mexico
- Pseudocellus monjarazi Valdez-Mondragón & Francke, 2013 — Mexico
- Pseudocellus olmeca Valdez-Mondragón, Francke & Botero-Trujillo, 2018 — Mexico
- Pseudocellus osorioi (Bolívar y Pieltain, 1946) — Mexico
- Pseudocellus oztotl Valdez-Mondragón & Francke, 2011 — Mexico
- Pseudocellus pachysoma Teruel & Armas, 2008 — Cuba
- Pseudocellus paradoxus (Cooke, 1972) — Cuba
- Pseudocellus pearsei (Chamberlin & Ivie, 1938) — Mexico
- Pseudocellus pelaezi (Coronado Gutierrez, 1970) — Mexico
- Pseudocellus permagnus Armas, 2017 — Cuba
- Pseudocellus platnicki Valdez-Mondragón & Francke, 2011 — Mexico
- Pseudocellus quetzalcoatl Valdez-Mondragón, Francke & Botero-Trujillo, 2018 — Mexico
- Pseudocellus reddelli (Gertsch, 1971) — Mexico
- Pseudocellus relictus (Chamberlin & Ivie, 1938) — Panama
- Pseudocellus sbordonii (Brignoli, 1974) — Mexico
- Pseudocellus seacus Platnick & Pass, 1982 — Guatemala
- Pseudocellus silvai (Armas, 1977) — Cuba
- Pseudocellus spinotibialis (Goodnight & Goodnight, 1952) — Mexico
- Pseudocellus undatus Armas, 2017 — Cuba
- Pseudocellus valerdii Valdez-Mondragón & Juárez-Sánchez, 2021 — Mexico
