= Pseudocellus bolivari =

Scientific classification
- Kingdom: Animalia
- Phylum: Arthropoda
- Subphylum: Chelicerata
- Class: Arachnida
- Order: Ricinulei
- Family: Ricinoididae
- Genus: Pseudocellus
- Species: P. bolivari

Binomial name
- Pseudocellus bolivari (Gertsch, 1971)

Synonyms
- Cryptocellus bolivari Gertsch, 1971

Species of spider-like animal

Pseudocellus bolivari is an arachnid species in the order Ricinulei. It occurs in caves in Chiapas, Mexico. The specific epithet is a tribute to Cándido Luis Bolívar y Pieltáin.
