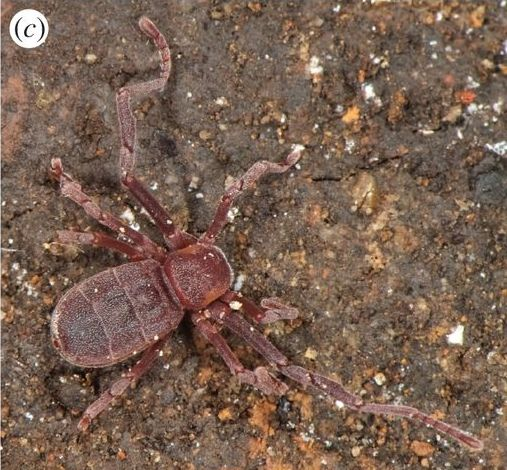

Scientific classification
- Kingdom: Animalia
- Phylum: Arthropoda
- Subphylum: Chelicerata
- Class: Arachnida
- Order: Ricinulei
- Family: Ricinoididae
- Genus: Pseudocellus
- Species: P. pearsei

Binomial name
- Pseudocellus pearsei (Chamberlin & Ivie, 1938)

Synonyms
- Cryptocellus pearsei Chamberlin & Ivie, 1938

= Pseudocellus pearsei =

Species of spider-like animal

Pseudocellus pearsei is an arachnid species in the order Ricinulei. It occurs in caves in Yucatán, Mexico.
