= Cryptocellus adisi =

Scientific classification
- Kingdom: Animalia
- Phylum: Arthropoda
- Subphylum: Chelicerata
- Class: Arachnida
- Order: Ricinulei
- Family: Ricinoididae
- Genus: Cryptocellus
- Species: C. adisi

Binomial name
- Cryptocellus adisi Platnick, 1988

Species of spider-like animal

Cryptocellus adisi is an arachnid species in the order Ricinulei. It occurs in Central Amazonia in Brazil.
