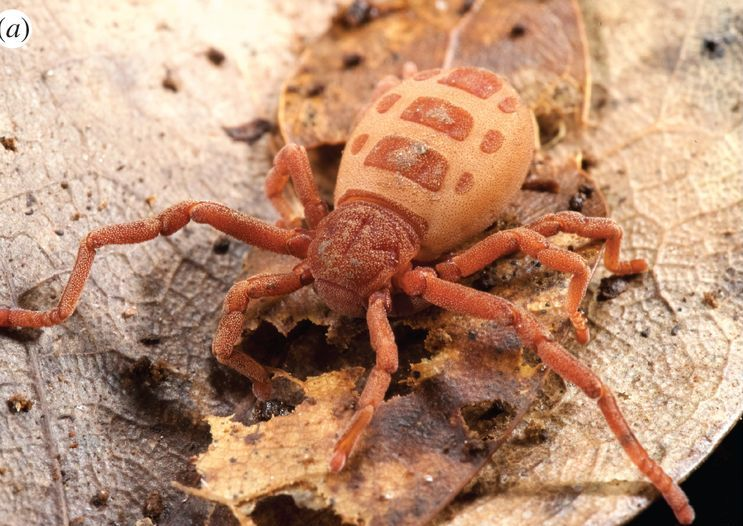
- Nymph of R. atewa

Scientific classification
- Domain: Eukaryota
- Kingdom: Animalia
- Phylum: Arthropoda
- Subphylum: Chelicerata
- Class: Arachnida
- Order: Ricinulei
- Family: Ricinoididae
- Genus: Ricinoides
- Species: R. atewa

Binomial name
- Ricinoides atewa Naskrecki, 2008

= Ricinoides atewa =

Species of spider-like animal

Ricinoides atewa is a ricinuleid of the Ricinoididae family found in Ghana. It is known to inhabit evergreen forests in eastern Ghana, including the Atewa Range Forest Reserve from which it takes its specific epithet. It is a dark reddish brown arachnid densely covered in short, translucent setae with a broad cucullus. At 9.63 mm long, Ricinoides atewa is one of the world's largest ricinuleids, part of a group of nine West African species referred to as the 'giant' ricinuleids.
