= Pseudocellus boneti =

Scientific classification
- Kingdom: Animalia
- Phylum: Arthropoda
- Subphylum: Chelicerata
- Class: Arachnida
- Order: Ricinulei
- Family: Ricinoididae
- Genus: Pseudocellus
- Species: P. boneti

Binomial name
- Pseudocellus boneti (Bolívar y Pieltain, 1942)

Synonyms
- Cryptocellus boneti Bolívar y Pieltáin, 1942

Species of spider-like animal

Pseudocellus boneti is an arachnid species in the order Ricinulei. It occurs in the Cacahuamilpa cave system in Guerrero, Mexico.
