= Pseudocellus cookei =

Scientific classification
- Kingdom: Animalia
- Phylum: Arthropoda
- Subphylum: Chelicerata
- Class: Arachnida
- Order: Ricinulei
- Family: Ricinoididae
- Genus: Pseudocellus
- Species: P. cookei

Binomial name
- Pseudocellus cookei (Gertsch, 1977)

Synonyms
- Cryptocellus cookei Gertsch, 1977

Species of spider-like animal

Pseudocellus cookei is an arachnid species in the order Ricinulei. It occurs only in the cueva Jobitzinaj in Petén, Guatemala.
