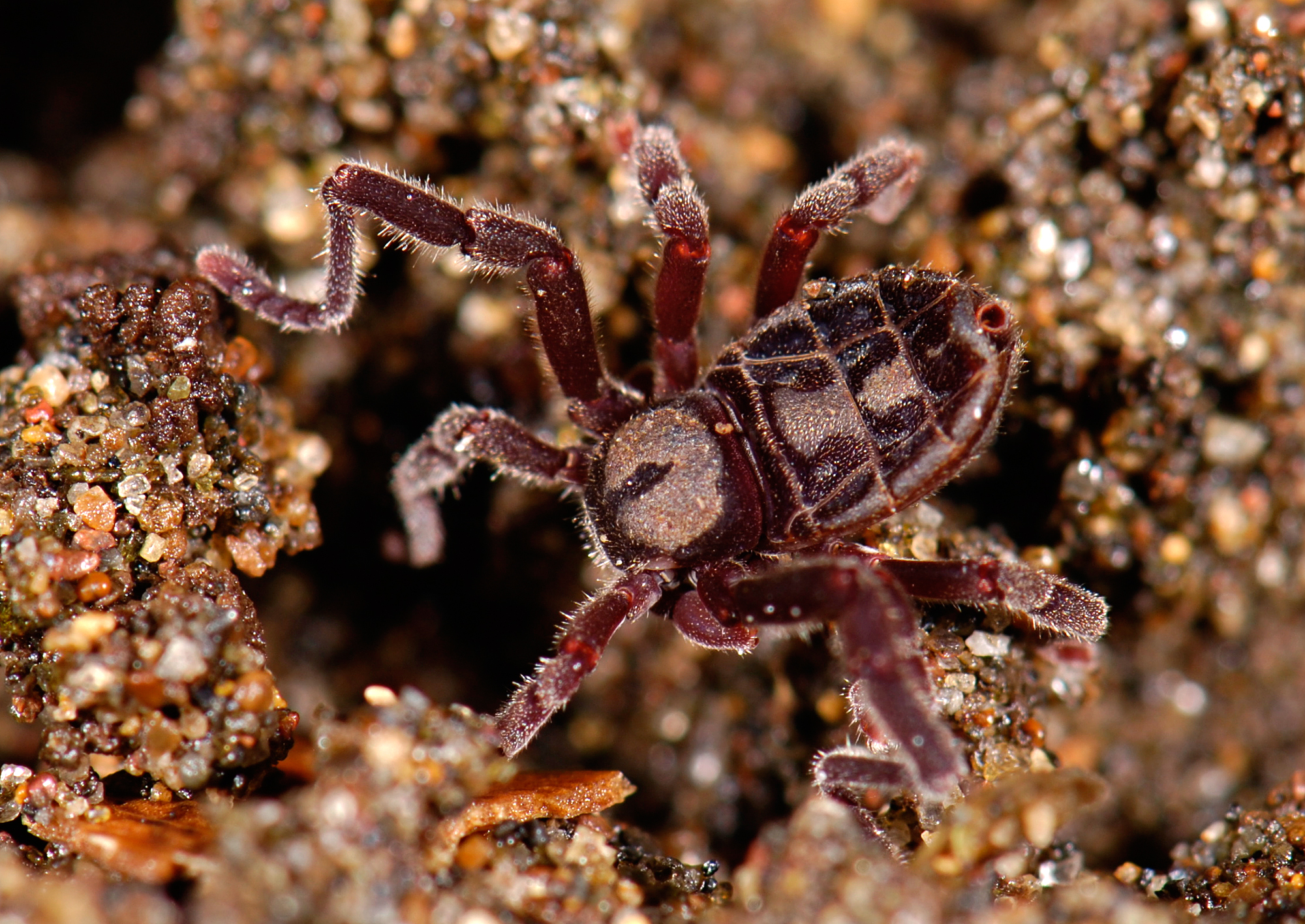

Scientific classification
- Kingdom: Animalia
- Phylum: Arthropoda
- Subphylum: Chelicerata
- Class: Arachnida
- Order: Ricinulei
- Family: Ricinoididae
- Genus: Cryptocellus
- Species: C. goodnighti

Binomial name
- Cryptocellus goodnighti Platnick & Shadab, 1981

= Cryptocellus goodnighti =

Species of spider-like animal

Cryptocellus goodnighti is an arachnid species in the genus Cryptocellus. It occurs in Costa Rica.
