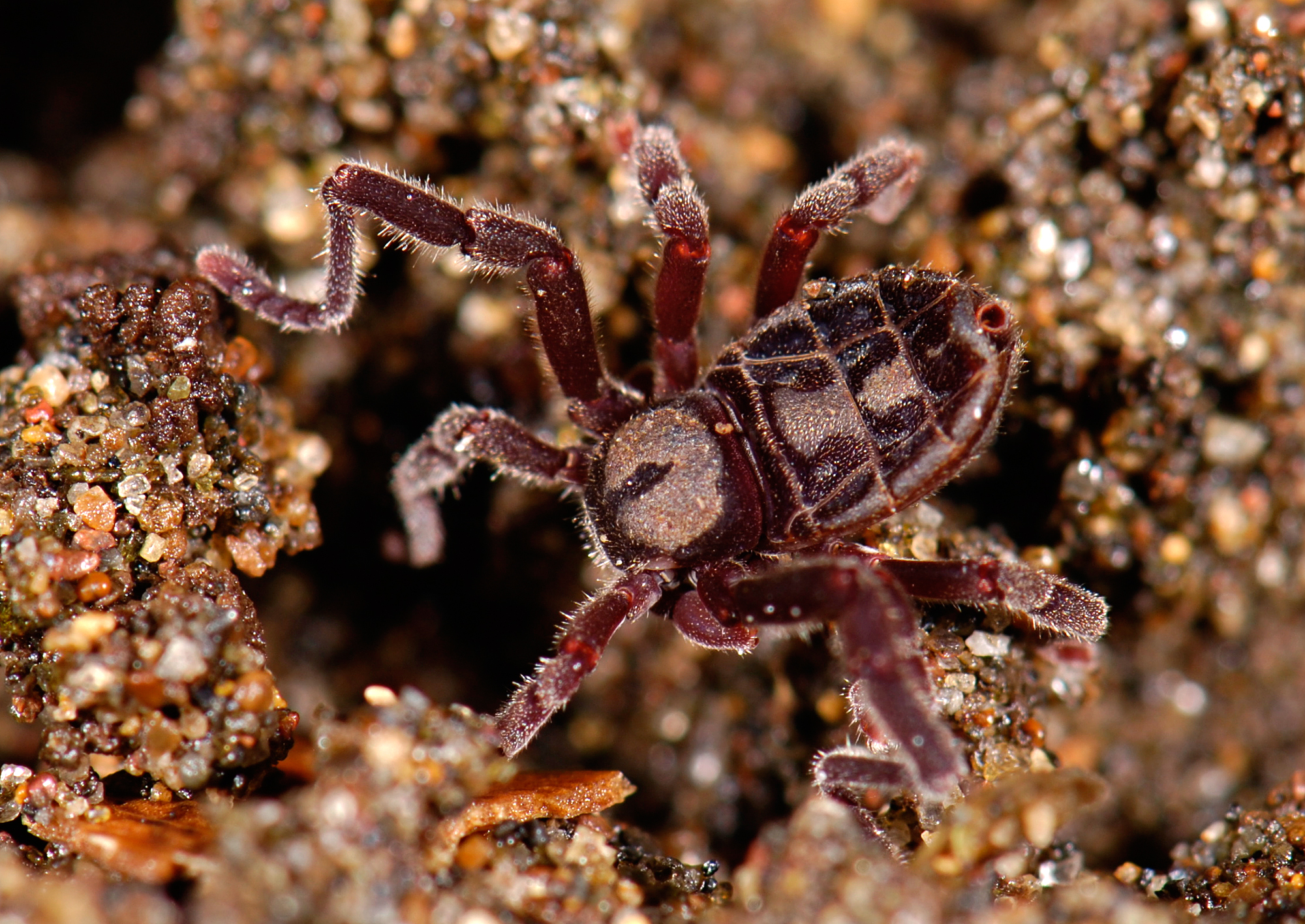
- Cryptocellus goodnighti

Scientific classification
- Kingdom: Animalia
- Phylum: Arthropoda
- Subphylum: Chelicerata
- Class: Arachnida
- Order: Ricinulei
- Family: Ricinoididae
- Genus: Cryptocellus; Westwood, 1874

Type species
- Cryptocellus foedus Westwood, 1874

Species
- 45, see text

Synonyms
- Heteroricinoides Dumitresco & Juvara-balş, 1977

= Cryptocellus =

Genus of spider-like animals

Cryptocellus is an arachnid genus in the order Ricinulei, first described by John Westwood in 1874. It is native to the Neotropics.

== Species ==
As of October 2022 it contains forty-five species:

- Cryptocellus abaporu Bonaldo & Pinto-da-Rocha, 2003 — Brazil
- Cryptocellus adisi Platnick, 1988 — Brazil
- Cryptocellus albosquamatus Cooke, 1967 — Guyana
- Cryptocellus becki Platnick & Shadab, 1977 — Brazil
- Cryptocellus bocas Platnick & Shadab, 1981 — Panama
- Cryptocellus bordoni (Dumitresco & Juvara-balş, 1977) — Venezuela
- Cryptocellus brignolii Cokendolpher, 2000 — Suriname
- Cryptocellus canga Pinto-da-Rocha & Andrade, 2012 — Brazil
- Cryptocellus canutama Botero-Trujillo, Carvalho, Florez D. & Prendini, 2021 — Brazil
- Cryptocellus centralis Fage, 1921 — Costa Rica
- Cryptocellus chimaera Botero-Trujillo & Valdez-Mondragón, 2016 — Ecuador
- Cryptocellus chiriqui Platnick & Shadab, 1981 — Costa Rica, Panama
- Cryptocellus chiruisla Botero-Trujillo & Flórez D., 2017 — Ecuador
- Cryptocellus conori Tourinho & Saturnino, 2010 — Brazil
- Cryptocellus fagei Cooke & Shadab, 1973 — Costa Rica
- Cryptocellus florezi Platnick & García, 2008 — Colombia
- Cryptocellus foedus Westwood, 1874 — Brazil
- Cryptocellus gamboa Platnick & Shadab, 1981 — Panama
- Cryptocellus glenoides Cooke & Shadab, 1973 — Colombia
- Cryptocellus goodnighti Platnick & Shadab, 1981 — Costa Rica
- Cryptocellus guaviarensis Botero-Trujillo & Flórez D., 2018 — Colombia
- Cryptocellus hanseni Cooke & Shadab, 1973 — Honduras, Nicaragua
- Cryptocellus iaci Tourinho, Man-Hung & Bonaldo, 2010 — Brazil
- Cryptocellus icamiabas Tourinho & de Azevedo, 2007 — Brazil
- Cryptocellus islacolon Botero-Trujillo, Carvalho, Florez D. & Prendini, 2021 — Panama
- Cryptocellus isthmius Cooke & Shadab, 1973 — Panama
- Cryptocellus jamari Botero-Trujillo, Carvalho, Florez D. & Prendini, 2021 — Brazil
- Cryptocellus lampeli Cooke, 1967 — Guyana
- Cryptocellus leleupi Cooreman, 1976 — Ecuador
- Cryptocellus lisbethae González-Sponga, 1998 — Venezuela
- Cryptocellus luisedieri Botero-Trujillo & Pérez, 2009 — Colombia
- Cryptocellus macagual Botero-Trujillo, Carvalho, Florez D. & Prendini, 2021 — Colombia
- Cryptocellus magnus Ewing, 1929 — Colombia
- Cryptocellus muiraquitan Tourinho, Lo-Man-Hung & Salvatierra, 2014 — Brazil
- Cryptocellus narino Platnick & Paz, 1979 — Colombia
- Cryptocellus osa Platnick & Shadab, 1981 — Costa Rica
- Cryptocellus peckorum Platnick & Shadab, 1977 — Colombia
- Cryptocellus platnicki Botero-Trujillo & Pérez, 2008 — Colombia
- Cryptocellus pseudocellatus Roewer, 1952 — Peru
- Cryptocellus simonis Hansen & Sørensen, 1904 — Brazil
- Cryptocellus sofiae Botero-Trujillo, 2014 — Colombia
- Cryptocellus striatipes Cooke & Shadab, 1973 — Costa Rica
- Cryptocellus tarsilae Pinto-da-Rocha & Bonaldo, 2007 — Brazil
- Cryptocellus verde Platnick & Shadab, 1981 — Costa Rica
- Cryptocellus whitticki Platnick & Shadab, 1977 — Guyana
