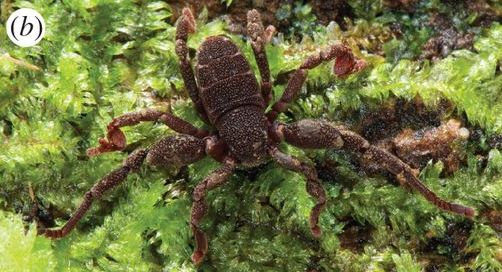
- Male Ricinoides karschii from Cameroon
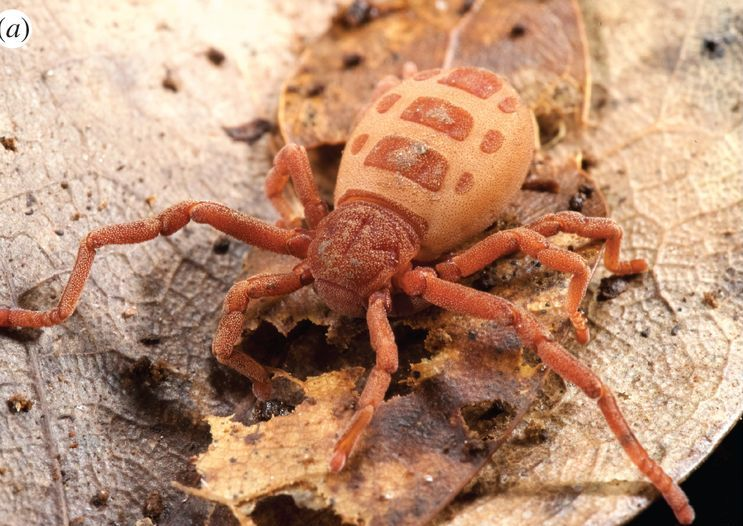
- Ricinoides atewa nymph from Ghana

Scientific classification
- Kingdom: Animalia
- Phylum: Arthropoda
- Subphylum: Chelicerata
- Class: Arachnida
- Order: Ricinulei
- Family: Ricinoididae
- Genus: Ricinoides; Ewing, 1929

Type species
- Ricinoides westermannii (Guérin-Méneville, 1838)

Species
- 16, see text

Synonyms
- Cryptostemma Guérin-Méneville, 1838

= Ricinoides =

Genus of spider-like animals

Ricinoides is an arthropod genus in the family Ricinoididae, first described by Henry Ewing in 1929.

== Distribution ==
Species in this genus are found in West Africa.

== Species ==
As of October 2022 it contains sixteen species:

- Ricinoides afzelii (Thorell, 1892) — Ghana, Guinea, Sierra Leone
- Ricinoides atewa Naskrecki, 2008 — Ghana
- Ricinoides crassipalpe (Hansen & Sørensen, 1904) — Cameroon, Equatorial Guinea
- Ricinoides eburneus Botero-Trujillo, Sain & Prendini, 2021 — Côte d’Ivoire
- Ricinoides feae (Hansen, 1921) — Guinea, Guinea-Bissau
- Ricinoides hanseni Legg, 1976 — Sierra Leone
- Ricinoides iita Botero-Trujillo, Sain & Prendini, 2021 — Nigeria
- Ricinoides kakum Botero-Trujillo, Sain & Prendini, 2021 — Ghana
- Ricinoides karschii (Hansen & Sørensen, 1904) — Cameroon, Congo, Gabon
- Ricinoides leonensis Legg, 1978 — Sierra Leone
- Ricinoides megahanseni Legg, 1982 — Côte d’Ivoire
- Ricinoides nzerekorensis Botero-Trujillo, Sain & Prendini, 2021 — Guinea
- Ricinoides olounoua Legg, 1978 — Cameroon
- Ricinoides sjostedtii (Hansen & Sørensen, 1904) — Cameroon, Nigeria
- Ricinoides taii Botero-Trujillo, Sain & Prendini, 2021 — Côte d’Ivoire
- Ricinoides westermannii (Guérin-Méneville, 1838) — Côte d’Ivoire, Ghana, Togo

In 2026, it was proposed that several species attributed to Ricinoides should be split out into several newly described genera, giving the new combinations Alantakun karschii, Bambara hanseni, Bambara megahanseni, Gizoo crassipalpe, Tautau leonensis, and Ududo sjostedtii.
