= Carcinothrips =

Scientific classification
- Kingdom: Animalia
- Phylum: Arthropoda
- Class: Insecta
- Order: Thysanoptera
- Family: Phlaeothripidae
- Genus: Carcinothrips; Moulton, 1929

Genus of thrips

Carcinothrips is a genus of thrips in the family Phlaeothripidae. It is found in Australia in New South Wales, the Northern Territory, Queensland and South Australia.

== Species ==
- Carcinothrips leai
- Carcinothrips tania
