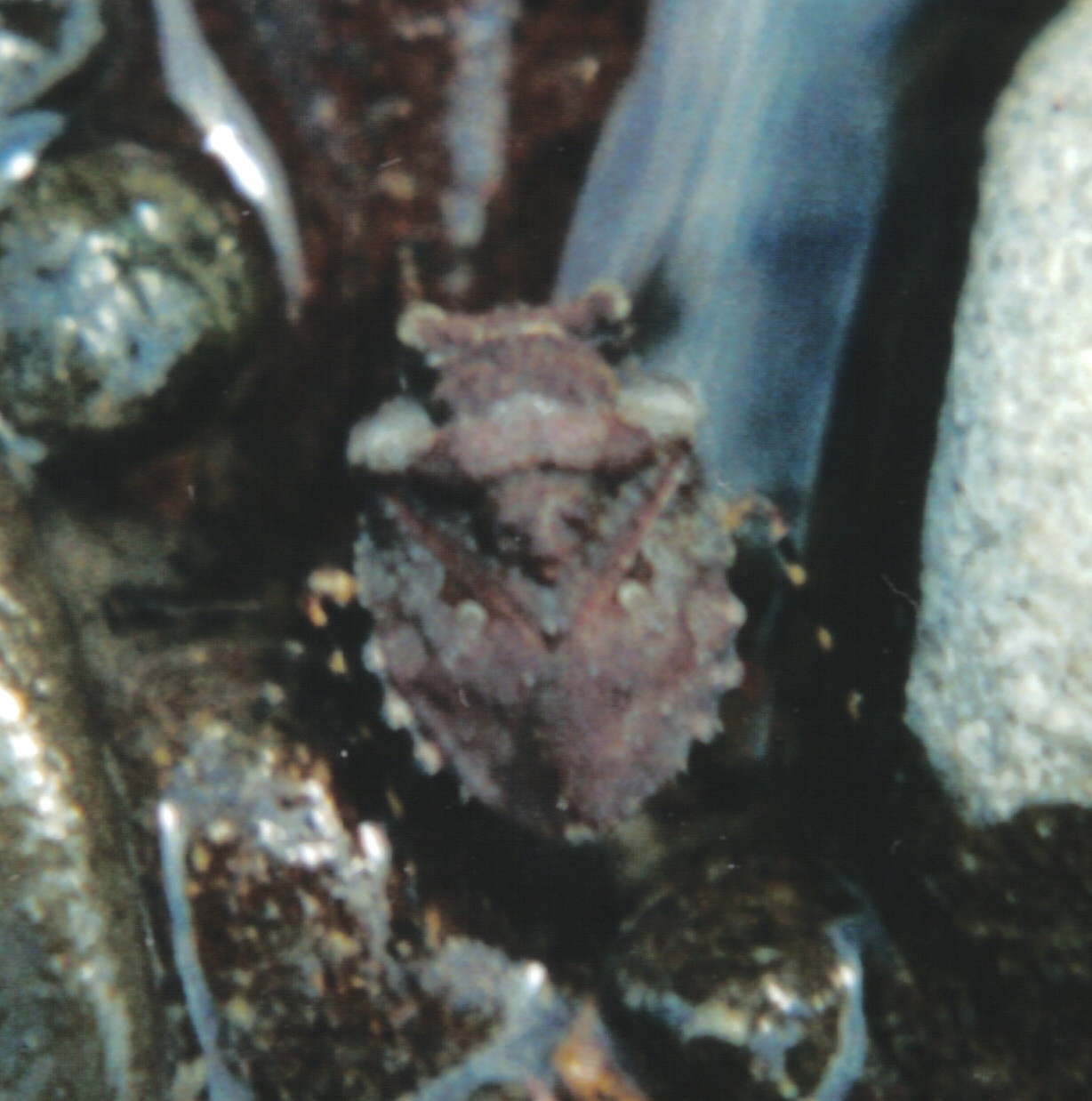
- Gelastocoridae at the edge of the Eel River, California

Scientific classification
- Kingdom: Animalia
- Phylum: Arthropoda
- Clade: Pancrustacea
- Class: Insecta
- Order: Hemiptera
- Suborder: Heteroptera
- Infraorder: Nepomorpha
- Clade: Tripartita
- Superfamily: Ochteroidea
- Family: Gelastocoridae

Genera
- Gelastocoris; Nerthra

Synonyms
- Galgulidae; Nerthridae

= Gelastocoridae =

Toad bugs Temporal range: Aptian–Present

Family of true bugs

The Gelastocoridae (toad bugs) is a family of about 100 species of insects in the suborder Heteroptera. These fall into two genera, about 15 species of Gelastocoris from the New World and 85 of Nerthra from the Old World. They are reminiscent of toads both in the warty appearance and hopping movements of some species.

== Biology ==
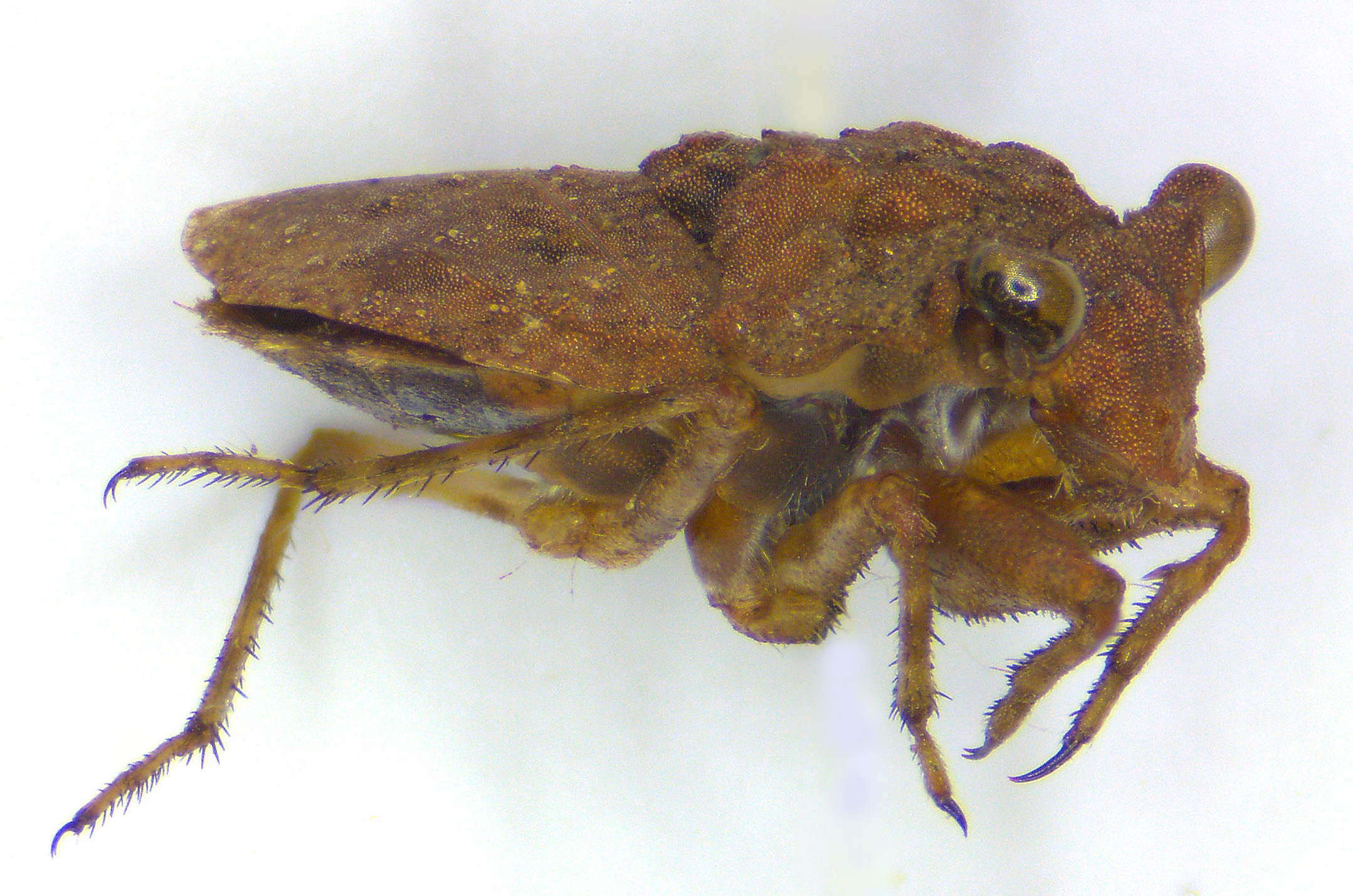
Stereomicroscope image of a toad bug

Gelastocoridae are riparian insects, generally found at the margins of streams and ponds, where they are predators of small insects. Gelastocoridae catch their prey by leaping on top of them and grasping them with their modified front legs. Members of the family are found throughout the world, but their highest diversity is in the tropics.

Adults lay their eggs in sand. There are 5 instars in their life cycle. Nymphs of many species cover themselves with a layer of sand grains. Apart from the no doubt considerable physical protection that the armour affords them, the layer of sand renders them effectively invisible on the ground unless they move at the wrong moment.

== Diagnostic characteristics ==
Gelastocoridae are short (6–15 mm or 0.24–0.59 in long) and stout, with large protuberant eyes and cryptic coloration. Many Gelastocoridae species can change their coloration to match their habitat. Like other Heteroptera, they have hemelytra for their forewings and piercing-sucking mouthparts. Their antennae are hidden. Males in the genera Nerthra have stridulatory mechanisms in the genital capsule, however sound produced by stridulation has never been observed.

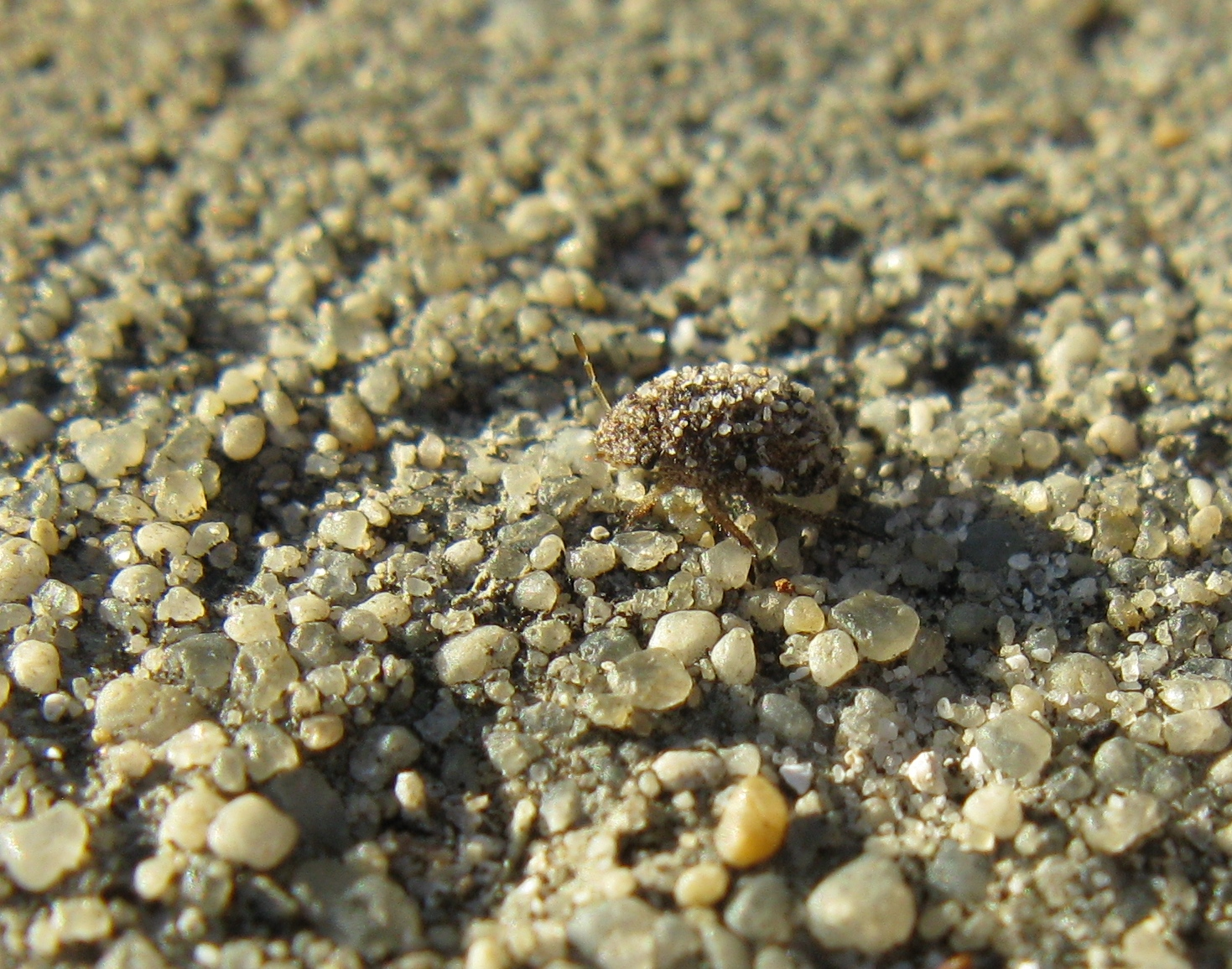
This photograph of a nymph near Helderberg in South Africa, demonstrates why they are so difficult to observe in the wild. This specimen was not more than 5mm long.

== Evolutionary history ==
The oldest record of the family is the genus Cratonerthra from the Aptian aged Crato Formation of Brazil. Fossils assignable to both extant genera are known from the Cenomanian aged Burmese amber of Myanmar. Carcinonepa, known from Burmese amber, may belong to this family.
