= Macrocephalus dorannae =

Scientific classification
- Domain: Eukaryota
- Kingdom: Animalia
- Phylum: Arthropoda
- Class: Insecta
- Order: Hemiptera
- Suborder: Heteroptera
- Family: Reduviidae
- Tribe: Macrocephalini
- Genus: Macrocephalus
- Species: M. dorannae

Binomial name
- Macrocephalus dorannae Evans, 1931

Species of true bug

Macrocephalus dorannae is a species of ambush bug in the family Reduviidae. It is found in North America.
