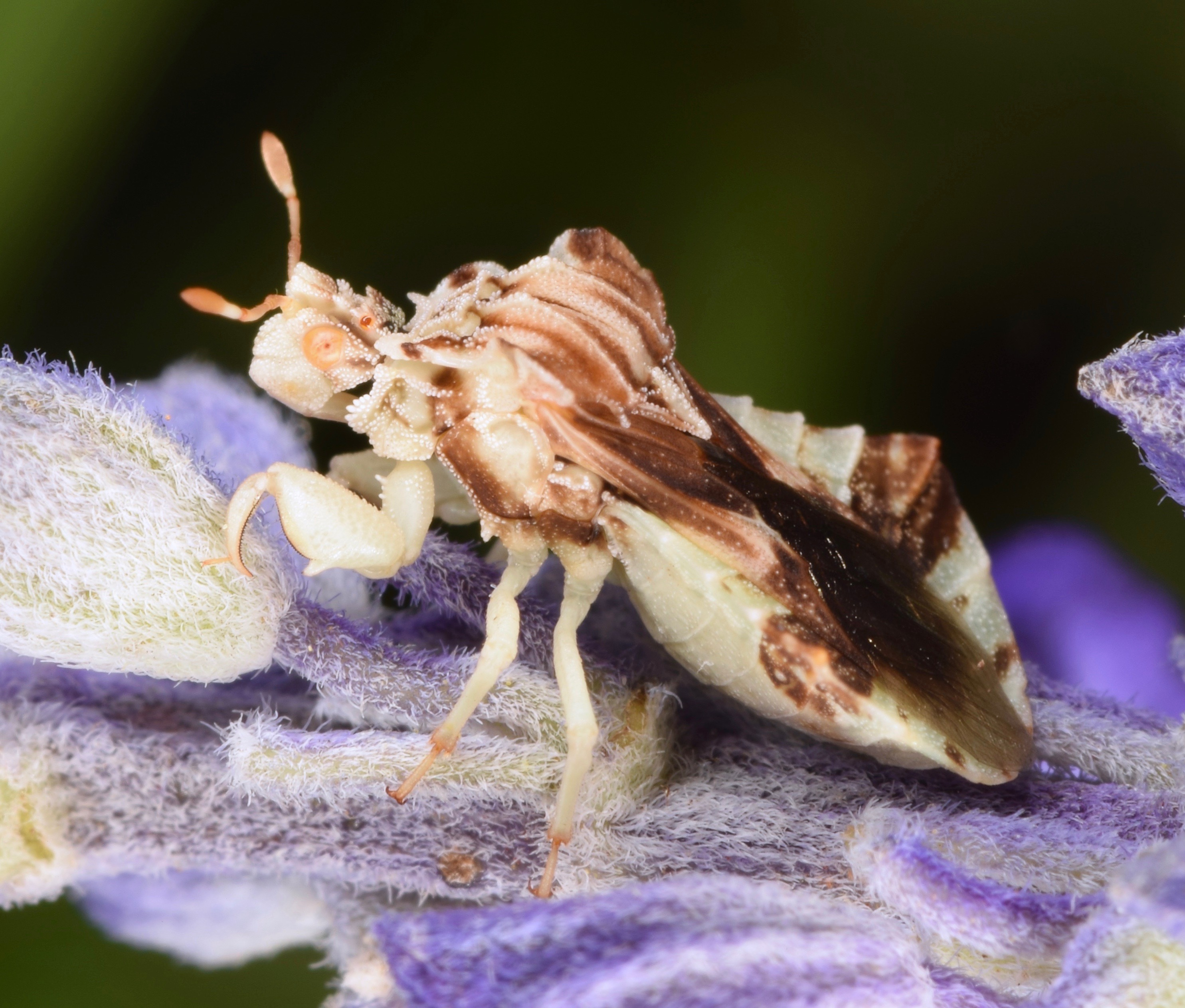

Scientific classification
- Domain: Eukaryota
- Kingdom: Animalia
- Phylum: Arthropoda
- Class: Insecta
- Order: Hemiptera
- Suborder: Heteroptera
- Family: Reduviidae
- Genus: Phymata
- Species: P. fasciata

Binomial name
- Phymata fasciata (Gray, 1832)

= Phymata fasciata =

Species of true bug

Phymata fasciata is a species of ambush bug in the family Reduviidae. It is found in Central America and North America.

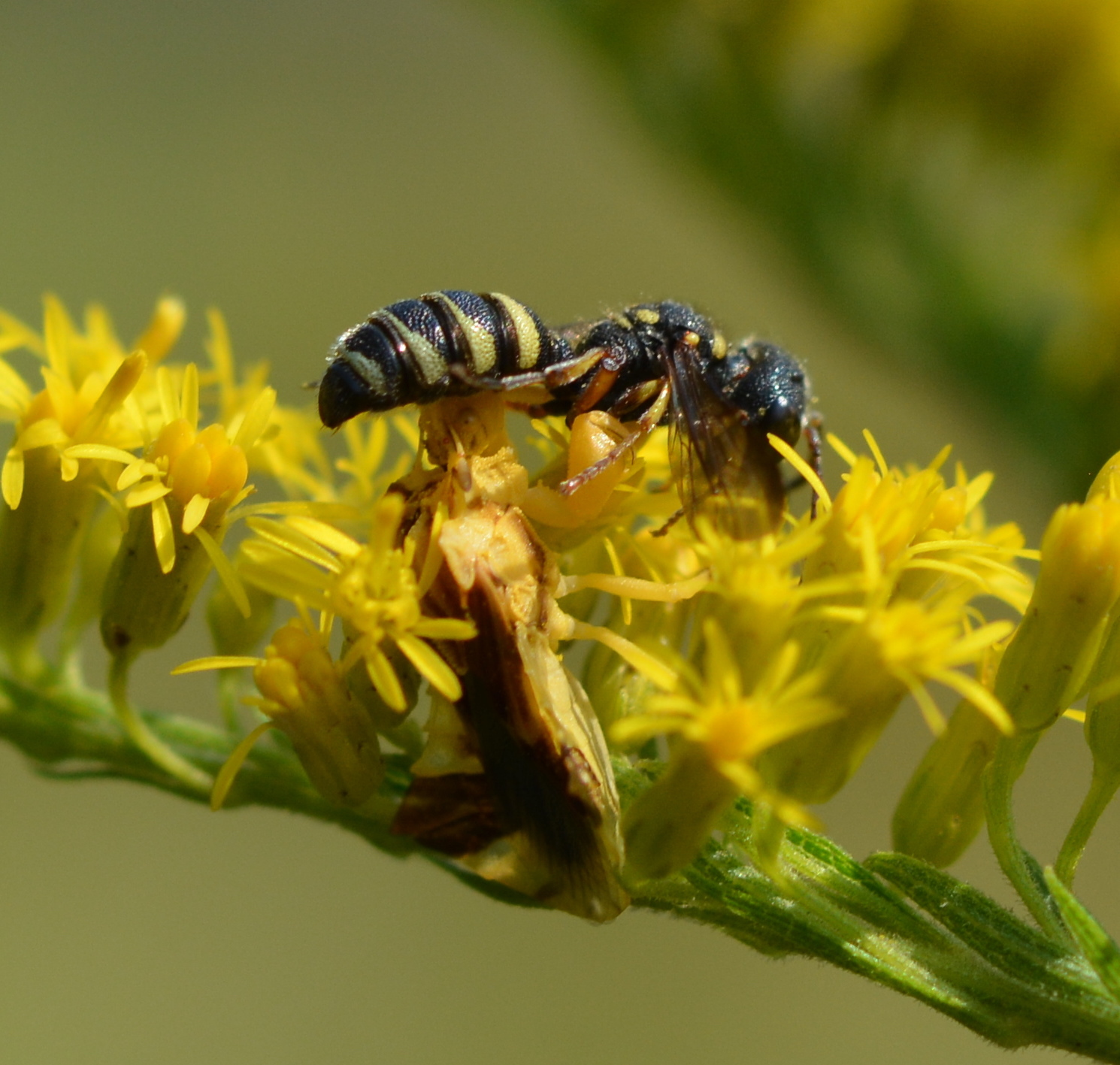
Feeding on a Cerceris wasp

== Subspecies ==
These four subspecies belong to the species Phymata fasciata:

- Phymata fasciata fasciata (Gray, 1832)
- Phymata fasciata mexicana Melin, 1930
- Phymata fasciata mystica Evans, 1931
- Phymata fasciata panamensis Kormilev, 1962
