= Phymata arctostaphylae =

Scientific classification
- Kingdom: Animalia
- Phylum: Arthropoda
- Class: Insecta
- Order: Hemiptera
- Suborder: Heteroptera
- Family: Reduviidae
- Genus: Phymata
- Species: P. arctostaphylae

Binomial name
- Phymata arctostaphylae Van Duzee, 1914

Species of true bug

Phymata arctostaphylae is a species of ambush bug in the family Reduviidae. It is found in North America.
