= Phymata luxa =

Scientific classification
- Domain: Eukaryota
- Kingdom: Animalia
- Phylum: Arthropoda
- Class: Insecta
- Order: Hemiptera
- Suborder: Heteroptera
- Family: Reduviidae
- Genus: Phymata
- Species: P. luxa

Binomial name
- Phymata luxa Evans, 1931

Species of true bug

Phymata luxa is a species of ambush bug in the family Reduviidae. It is found in North America.
