= Lophoscutus prehensilis =

Scientific classification
- Kingdom: Animalia
- Phylum: Arthropoda
- Class: Insecta
- Order: Hemiptera
- Suborder: Heteroptera
- Family: Reduviidae
- Genus: Lophoscutus
- Species: L. prehensilis

Binomial name
- Lophoscutus prehensilis (Fabricius, 1803)

Species of true bug

Lophoscutus prehensilis is a species of ambush bug in the family Reduviidae. It is found in Central America and North America.

== Subspecies ==
These two subspecies belong to the species Lophoscutus prehensilis:

- Lophoscutus prehensilis minor (Kormilev, 1954)
- Lophoscutus prehensilis prehensilis (Fabricius, 1803)
