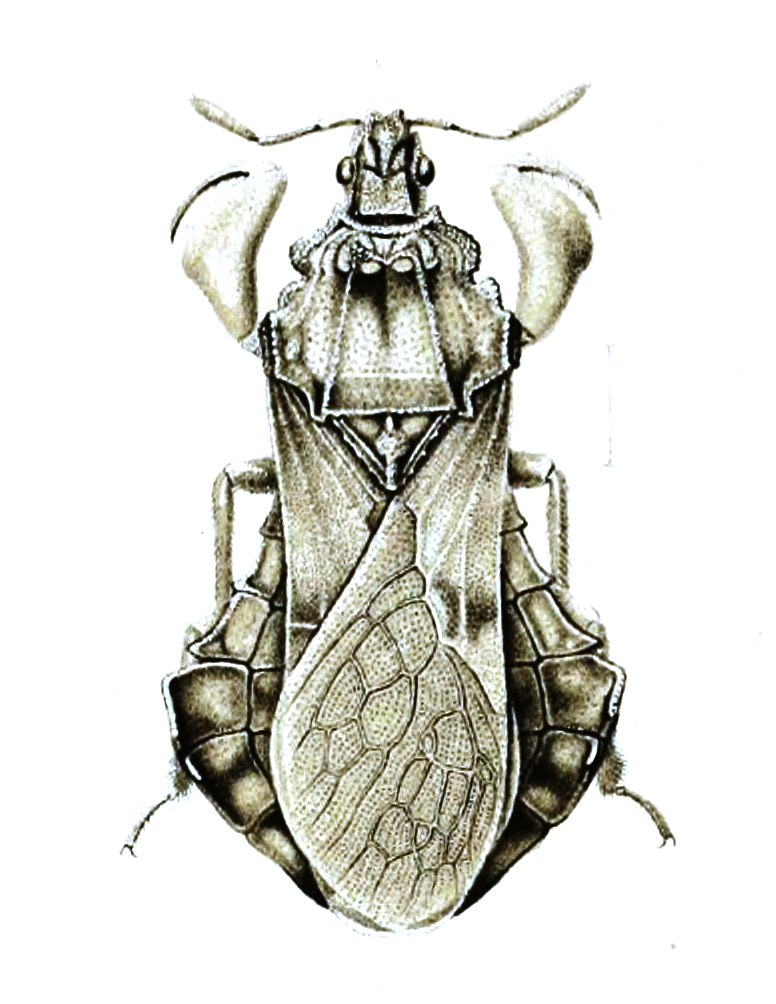
- Female

Scientific classification
- Domain: Eukaryota
- Kingdom: Animalia
- Phylum: Arthropoda
- Class: Insecta
- Order: Hemiptera
- Suborder: Heteroptera
- Family: Reduviidae
- Genus: Phymata
- Species: P. noualhieri

Binomial name
- Phymata noualhieri Handlirsch, 1897

= Phymata noualhieri =

Species of true bug

Phymata noualhieri is a species of ambush bug in the family Reduviidae. It is found in Central America and North America.
