= Phymata pacifica =

Scientific classification
- Domain: Eukaryota
- Kingdom: Animalia
- Phylum: Arthropoda
- Class: Insecta
- Order: Hemiptera
- Suborder: Heteroptera
- Family: Reduviidae
- Genus: Phymata
- Species: P. pacifica

Binomial name
- Phymata pacifica Evans, 1931

Species of true bug

Phymata pacifica is a species of ambush bug in the family Reduviidae. It is found in North America.

== Subspecies ==
These three subspecies belong to the species Phymata pacifica:

- Phymata pacifica hainesi Kormilev, 1962
- Phymata pacifica pacifica Evans, 1931
- Phymata pacifica stanfordi Evans, 1931
