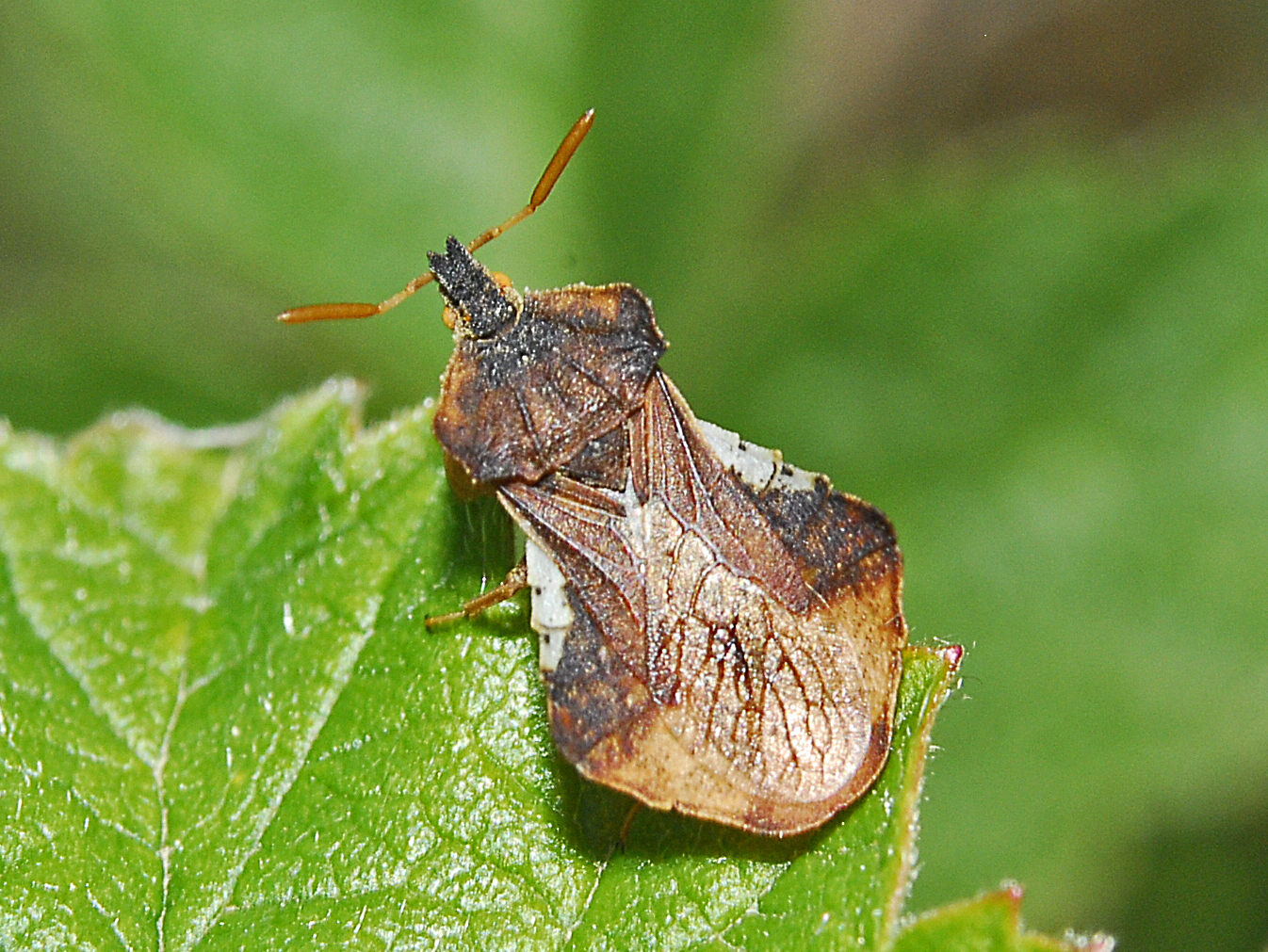
- Male
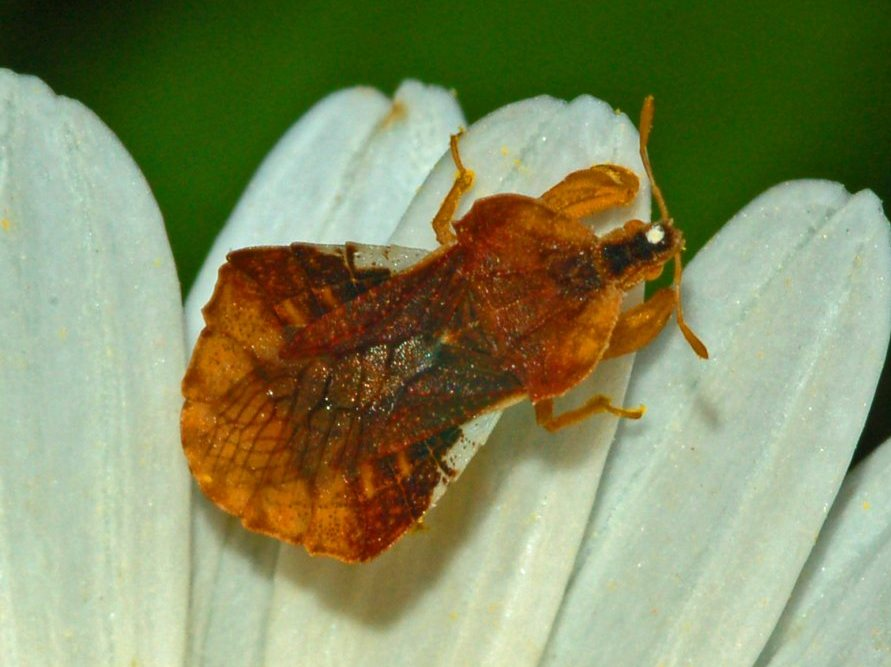
- Female

Scientific classification
- Domain: Eukaryota
- Kingdom: Animalia
- Phylum: Arthropoda
- Class: Insecta
- Order: Hemiptera
- Suborder: Heteroptera
- Family: Reduviidae
- Genus: Phymata
- Species: P. crassipes

Binomial name
- Phymata crassipes (Fabricius, 1775)

Synonyms
- Acanthia crassipes (Fabricius, 1775)

= Phymata crassipes =

Species of true bug

Phymata crassipes is a species of assassin and thread-legged bugs belonging to the family Reduviidae, subfamily Phymatinae.

== Distribution ==
This species is widespread in the Palearctic realm. It can be found in the Mediterranean, North Africa, Central Europe eastward to Korea, north of China and Siberia. It is not present in the north-west of Europe and in the Britain Islands.

== Habitat ==
These bugs inhabit dry biotopes with sufficient sun exposure, especially calcareous grasslands, rocky heaths, south-facing slopes or forest edges.

== Description ==
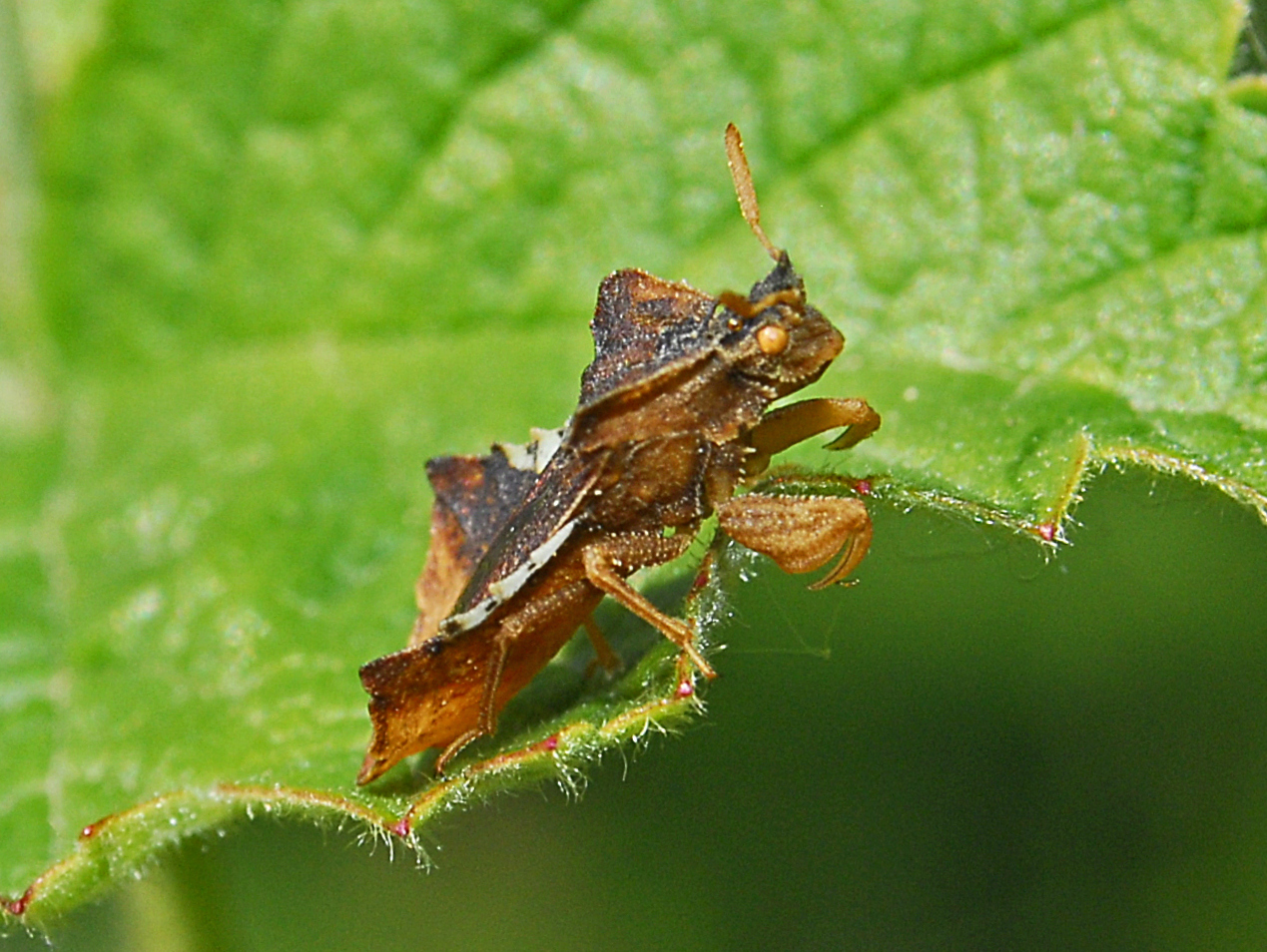
Male, lateral view

Adults of Phymata crassipes can reach a length of about 7–9 mm. The body appear ornamented with some extrusions. Their triangular scutellum is shorter than a pronotum without prominent tubercles. They possess functional wings. They have clubbed antennae and enlarged fore femora and abdomen. The edge of the abdomen expands beyond the edges of the wings. Beautifully camouflaged, they capture their prey using their raptorial fore legs.

The basic body color is dark reddish-brown in males, while females are lighter yellow-brown. Moreover, in the males the antennae terminate with a cylindrical joint, thicker and longer than all other segments, while the females antennae are terminated by a more clavate joint, not as long as the preceding ones.

This species is rather similar to Phymata monstrosa, present in South West Europe, that shows small bumps on the femora of the median and hind legs.

== Biology ==
This species overwinters as imago or in the larval stage. The overwintering bugs can be found and mate in early spring and the females lay their eggs on plant stems. The larvae can be found in early June. The new adult generation will appear in July.

Males, females and larvae when disturbed can produce low-frequency sounds, which can not be heard by humans.

Both adults and nymphs are predators, by means of their front legs modified to raptor appendages. They usually wait motionless on flowers for their preys, which consist of various insects, other arthropods and spider species. The prey can also be significantly larger than themselves, and bees, for example, can be successfully hunted.

== Gallery ==
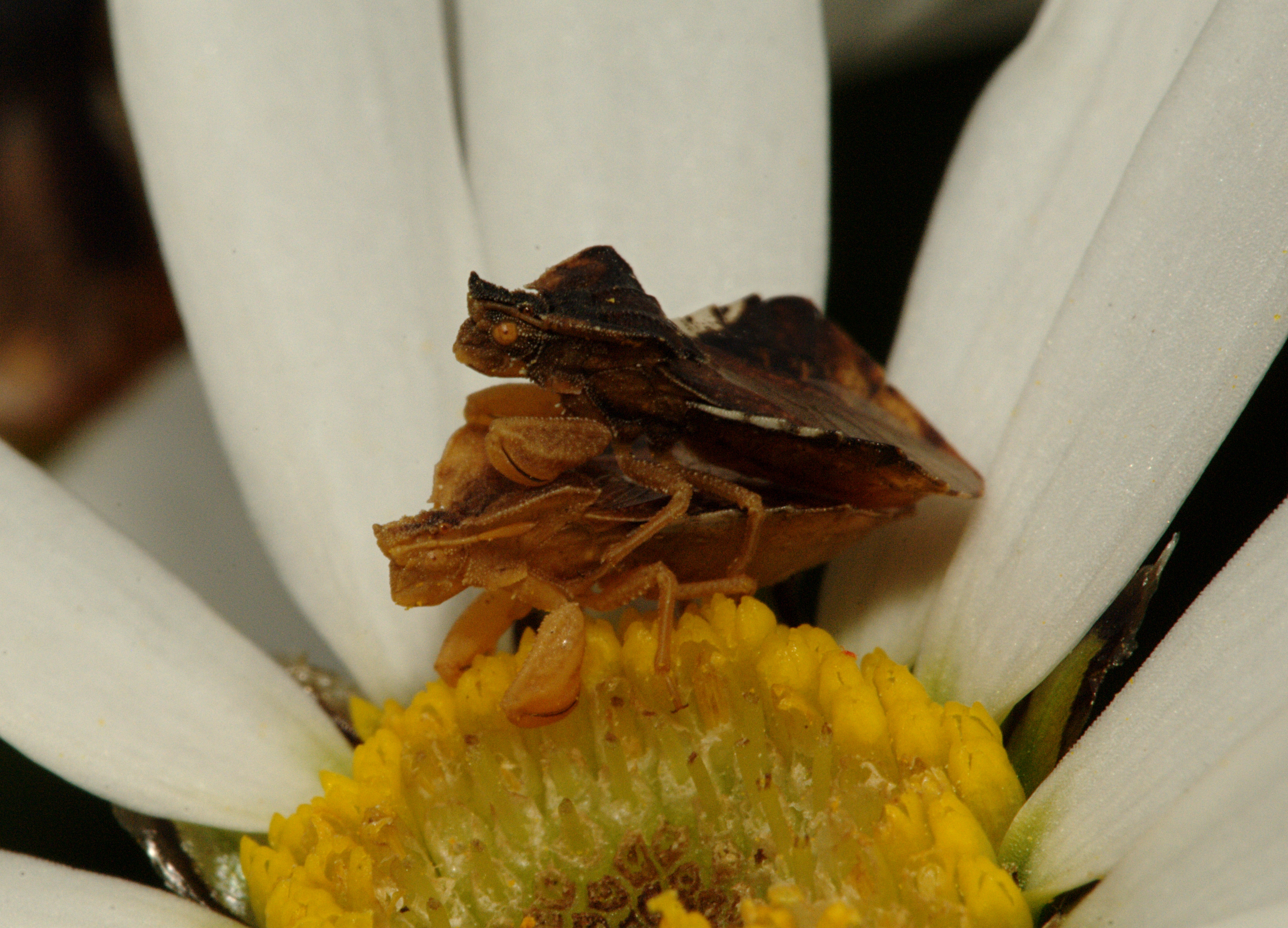
Mating

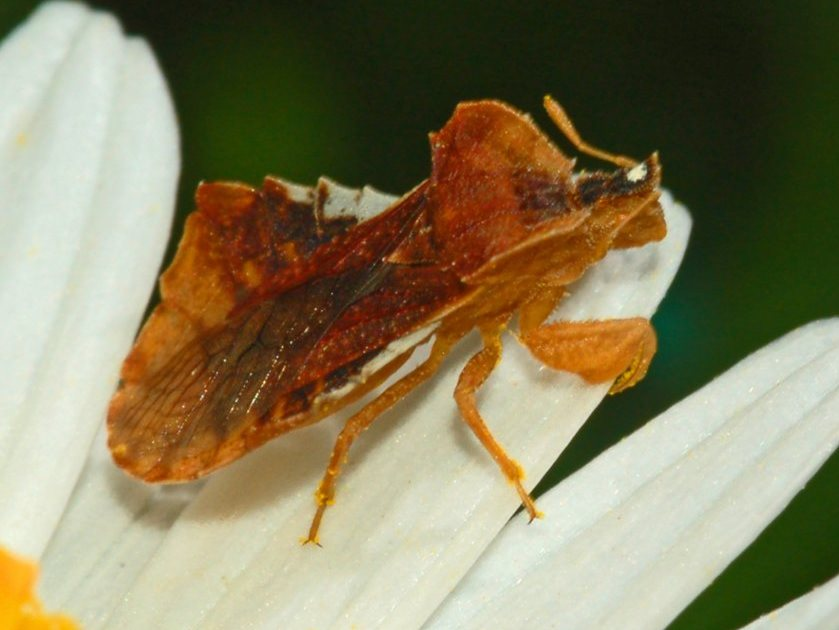
Female, lateral view

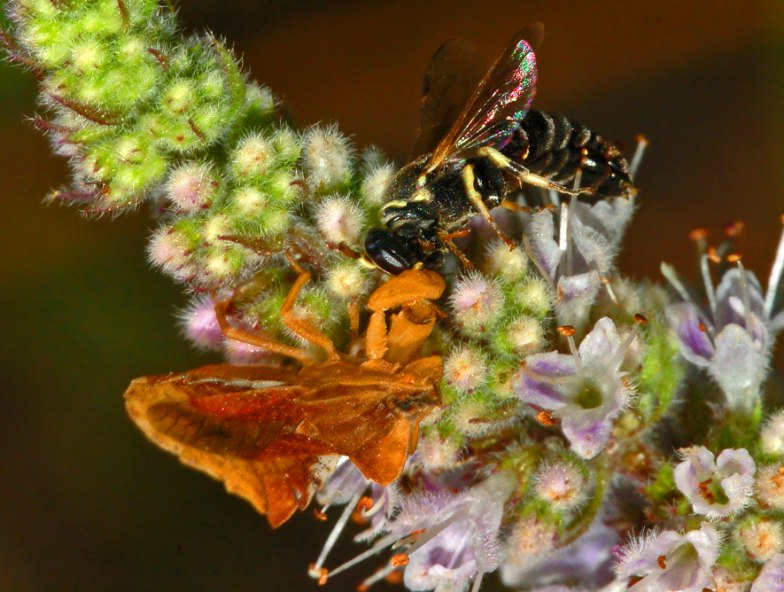
Hunting a wasp

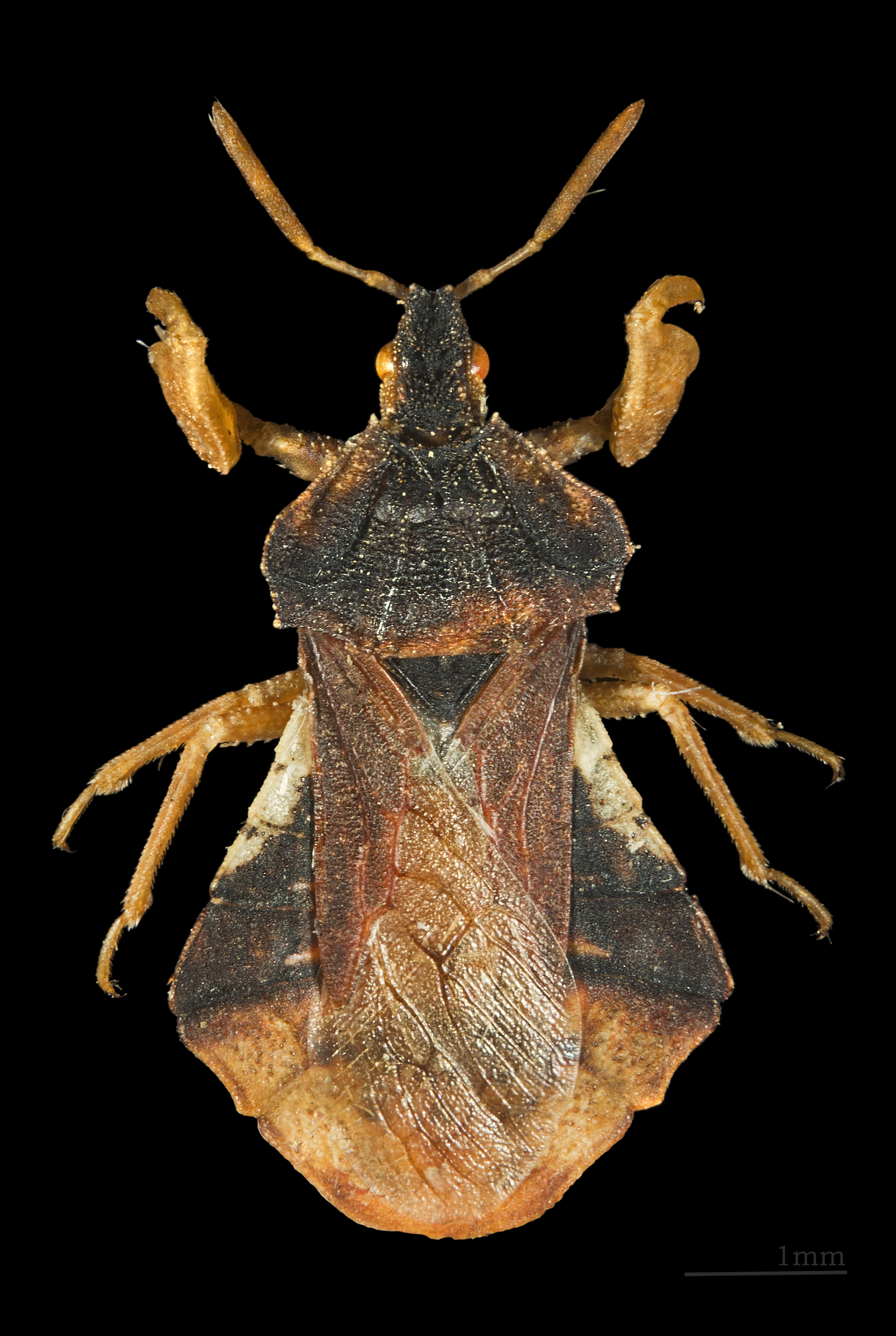
Mounted specimen - MHNT

== Bibliography ==
- Amyot, C. J. B., and Audinet Serville (1843), Histoire Naturelle des Insectes Hémiptères
- Aukema, Berend, and Christian Rieger, eds. (1996), Catalogue of the Heteroptera of the Palaearctic Region, vol. 2: Cimicomorpha I
- Ekkehard Wachmann: Wanzen beobachten – kennenlernen. Neumann-Neudamm, Melsungen 1989, ISBN 3-7888-0554-4.
- Frieder Sauer: Sauers Naturführer Wanzen und Zikaden nach Farbfotos erkannt. Fauna, Keltern 1996, ISBN 3-923010-12-5.
