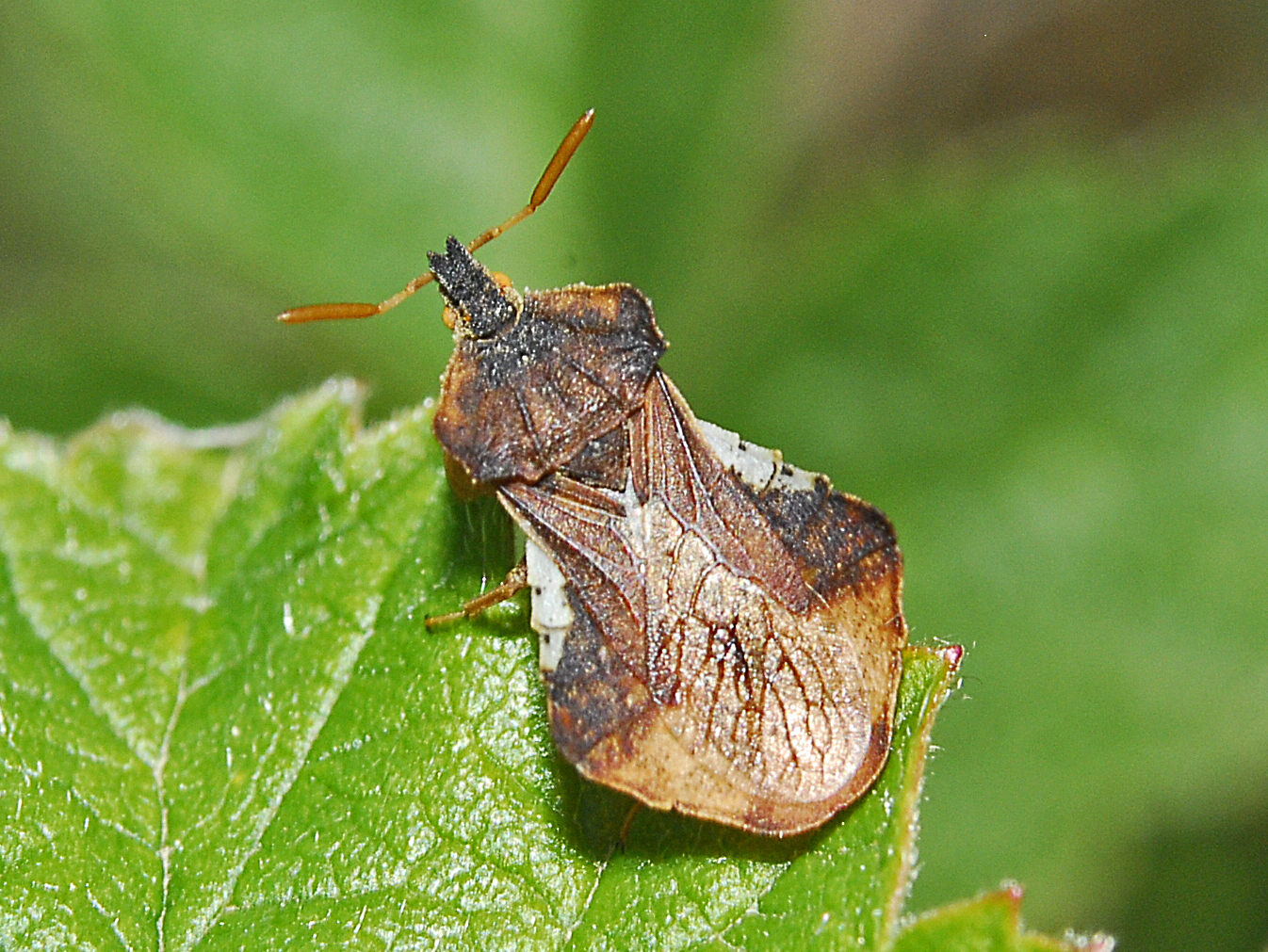
- Phymata crassipes

Scientific classification
- Kingdom: Animalia
- Phylum: Arthropoda
- Class: Insecta
- Order: Hemiptera
- Suborder: Heteroptera
- Family: Reduviidae
- Tribe: Phymatini
- Genus: Phymata; Latreille, 1802

= Phymata =

Genus of true bugs

Phymata is a genus of assassin bugs belonging to the family Reduviidae, subfamily Phymatinae, commonly called jagged ambush bugs. Their coloration is variable, often helping to camouflage them on the plants where they live. They are predators, found in the Americas and Palaearctic realm.

== Species ==
Species within this genus include:

- Phymata albopicta Handlirsch, 1897
- Phymata americana Melin, 1930
- Phymata arctostaphylae Van Duzee, 1914
- Phymata borica Evans, 1931
- Phymata crassipes Fabricius, 1775 - type species (as Acanthia crassipes Fabricius)
- Phymata fasciata Gray, 1832
- Phymata granulosa Handlirsch, 1897
- Phymata luteomarginata Kormilev, 1957
- Phymata luxa Evans, 1931
- Phymata maculata Kormilev, 1957
- Phymata noualhieri Handlirsch, 1897
- Phymata pacifica Evans, 1931
- Phymata pallida Kormilev, 1957
- Phymata pennsylvanica Handlirsch, 1897
- Phymata rossi Evans, 1931
- Phymata saileri Kormilev, 1957
- Phymata salicis Cockerell, 1900
- Phymata vicina Handlirsch, 1897

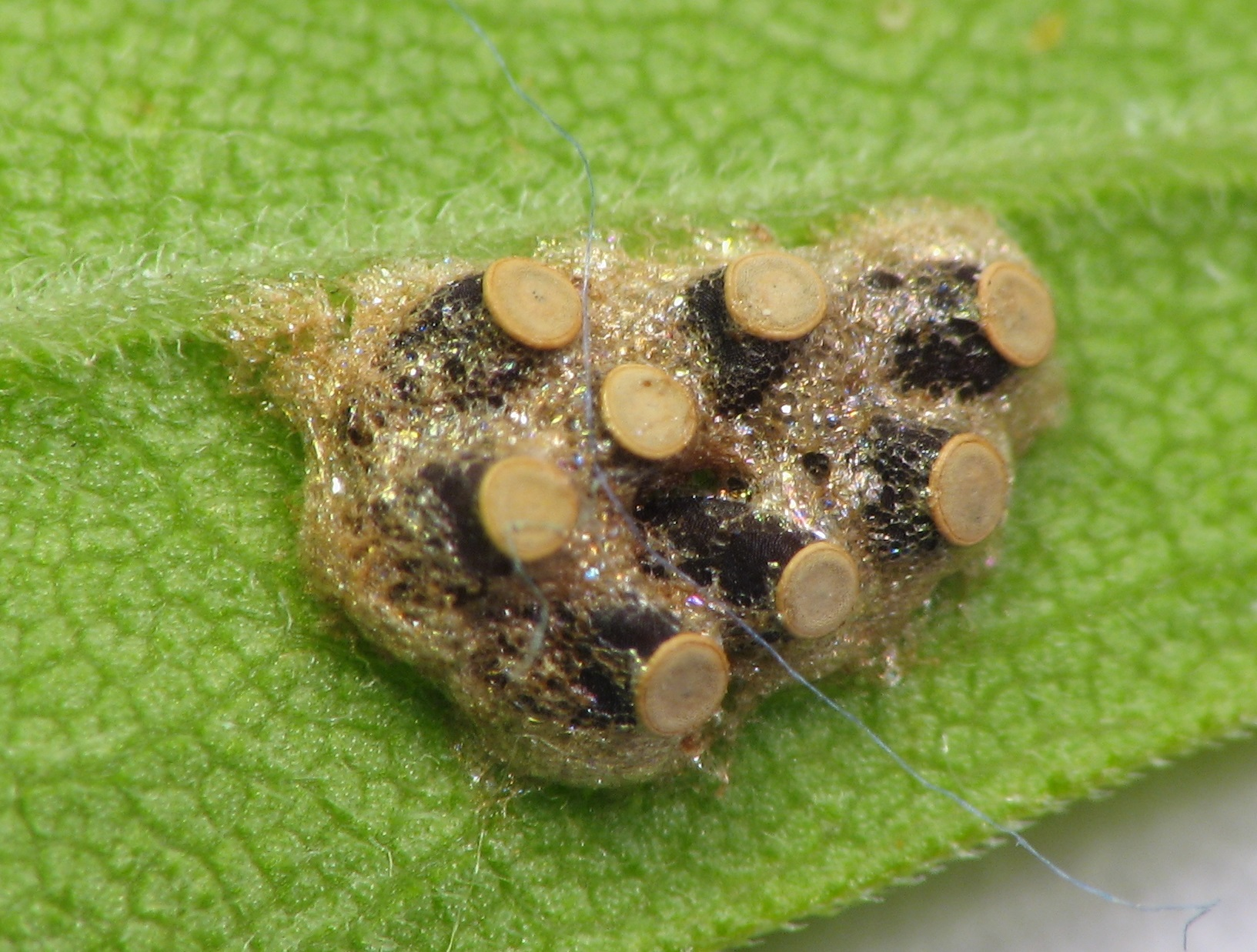
Phymata sp. eggs
