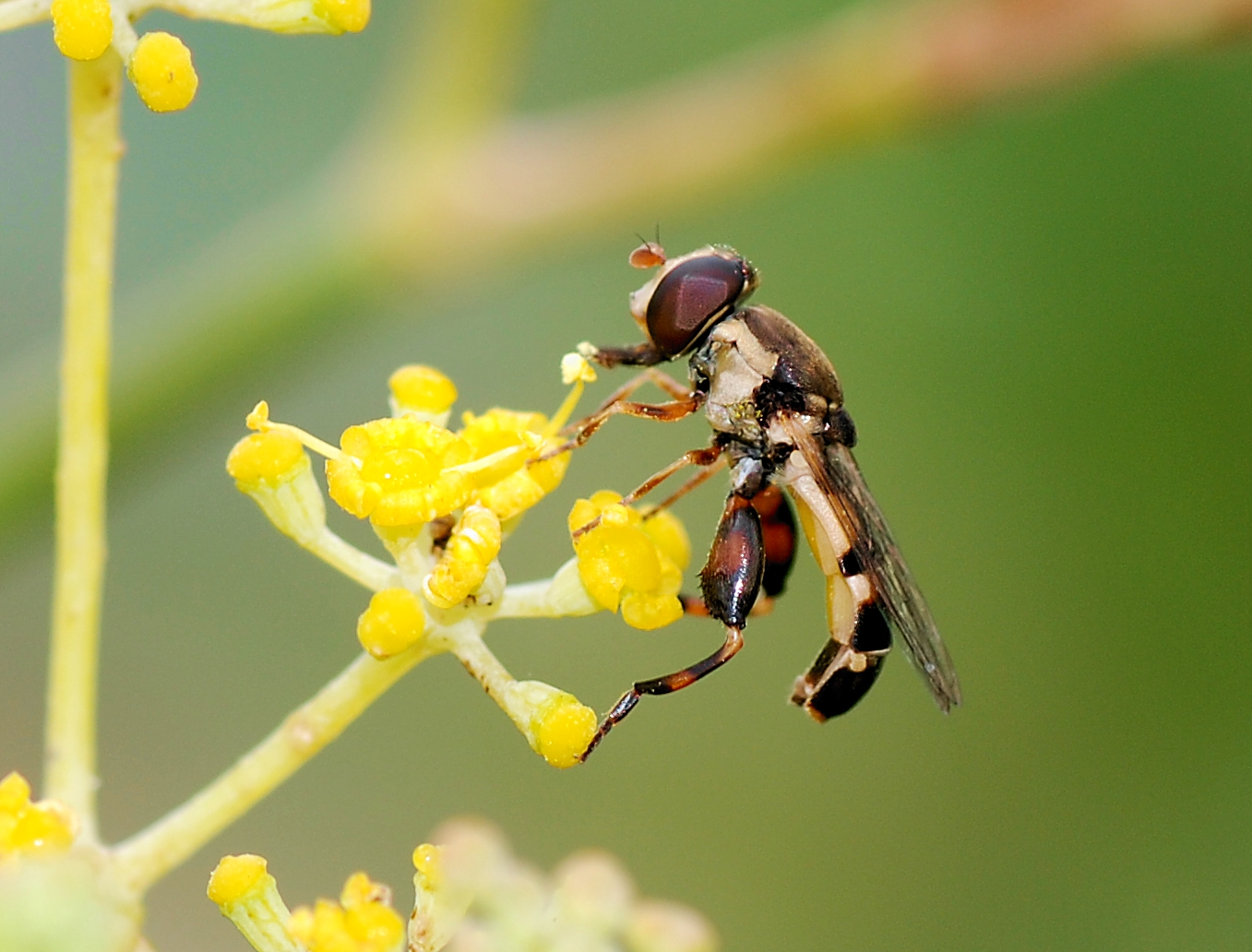
- Male
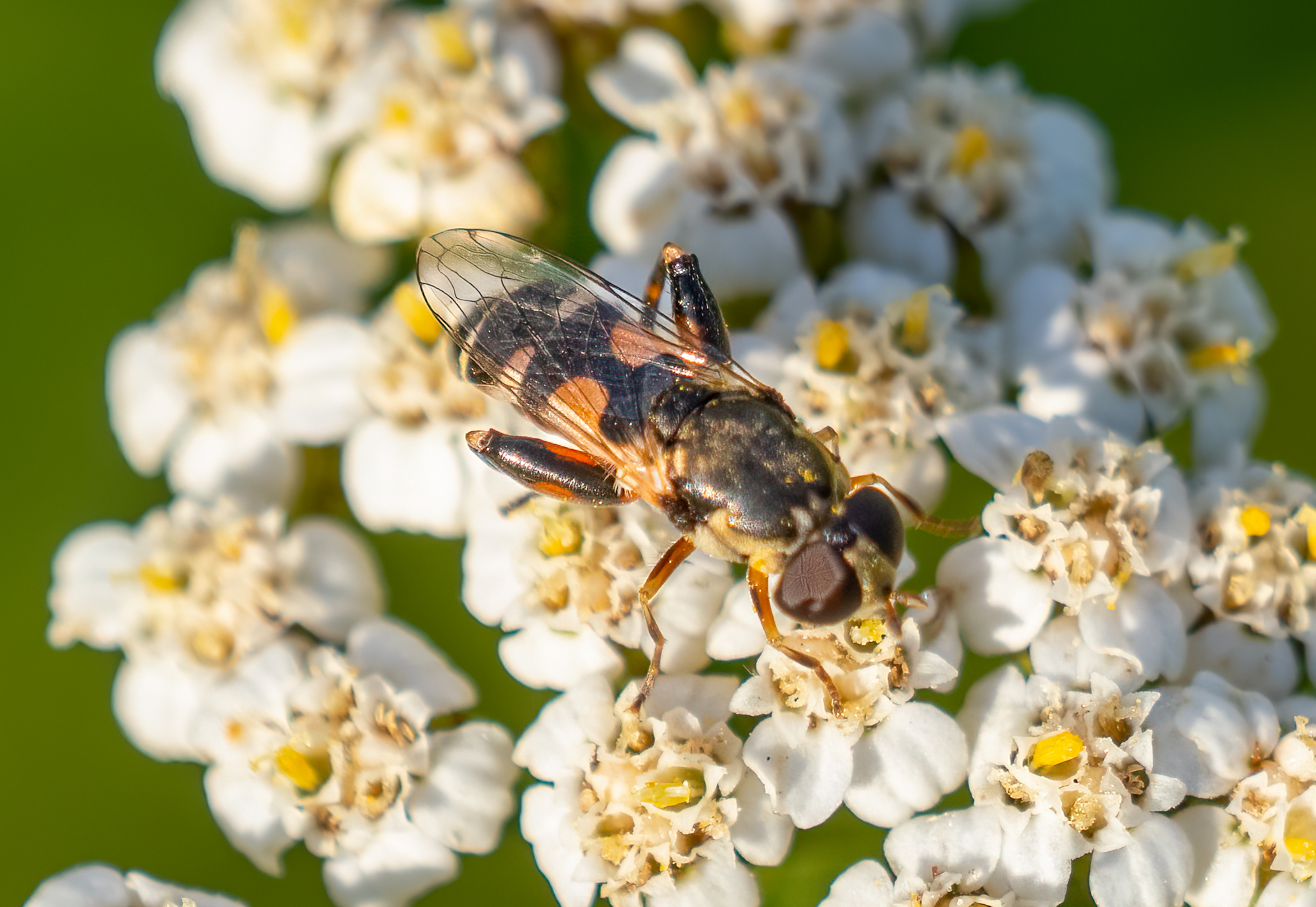
- Female

Scientific classification
- Kingdom: Animalia
- Phylum: Arthropoda
- Clade: Pancrustacea
- Class: Insecta
- Order: Diptera
- Family: Syrphidae
- Subfamily: Eristalinae
- Tribe: Milesiini
- Genus: Syritta
- Species: S. pipiens

Binomial name
- Syritta pipiens (Linnaeus, 1758)

Synonyms
- Musca pipiens Linnaeus, 1758; Musca pipines Geoffroy, 1785; Spheginoides tenofemorus Dzhafarova, 1974; Xylota proxima Say, 1824

= Syritta pipiens =

Species of fly

Syritta pipiens

Syritta pipiens, sometimes called the thick-legged hoverfly, is one of the most common species in the insect family Syrphidae. This fly originates from Europe and is currently distributed across Eurasia and North America. They are fast and nimble fliers, and their larvae are found in wet, rotting organic matter such as garden compost, manure, and silage. The species is also commonly found in human-created environments such as most farmland, gardens, and urban parks, wherever there are flowers. This species is an important part of its native ecosystem as adult Syritta pipiens flies are critical pollinators for a variety of flowering plants and the species supports parasitism by various parasitic wasp species. Thus, they play an important role in environmental functionality, and can serve as bio-indicators, in which their abundance can reflect the health of the environment. Syritta pipiens looks like many predatory hoverfly species, yet is not predatory.

== Morphology ==
The species Syritta pipiens is within the family of Syrphidae, commonly called hover or flower flies. Syrphidae is one of the largest families within the Diptera order and contains about 6,000 known species widely distributed around the world. They are distinctive flies that are often found on flowers, where the adult males primarily feed on nectar and adult females eat protein-rich pollen to produce eggs.

The name "thick-legged hoverfly" comes from the fly's distinctively broad femora. A thick-legged hoverfly has a wing length ranging between 4.25–7 mm (0.167–0.276 in) and a body length between 6.5–9 mm (0.26–0.35 in). Both sexes have apical third of metafemur and a row of spines along the ventral edge. Another distinctive morphological feature is the pair of small white wedge-shaped spots on the fly's thorax directly behind its head. The male femur 3 is strongly thickened. It has no basal protuberance. Tergites 2 and 3 have small, pale marks. Female tergites have similar markings, with ocellar triangle bluish-black, metallic sheen. Side margins of thorax dorsum are dusted. Side and hind margins of tergite 4 are not dusted. See references for determination.

The eyes of Syritta pipiens span over almost the entirety of their heads. Both sexes have similarly sized hemispherical heads, with a diameter of 2 mm. However, the eyes differ among the two sexes in two ways. First, males have holoptic eyes, meaning that their eyes meet in the front, which is a feature common in male syrphid flies. Second, males have enlarged facets (fovea) between the clypeus and ocellar triangle, which are absent in females.

== Taxonomy ==
The family Syrphidae divides into four subfamilies: Eristalinae, Microdontinae, Pipizinae, and Syrphinae. Syritta pipiens belong to the subfamily Eristalinae, closely related to the well-known dronefly, Eristalis tenax.

== Distribution and habitat ==
Syritta pipiens have been found across North American as well as Asia since their first introduction from Europe in 1800s. The species is cosmopolitan except for the Afrotropical realm. It is found wherever there are flowers, as it feeds on and lives around flowers. It is also anthropophilic, occurring in farmland, suburban gardens, and urban parks. It is found in mid April to mid October in Ontario; in Europe, it flies from March to November, as most records show, but it is also likely that it flies all year round in southern European regions where it is warmer. At the larval stage, the species inhabits wetlands that are in proximity to bodies of freshwater such as lakes, ponds, rivers, ditches.

== Life history ==
Syritta pipiens goes through three adolescent stages – eggs, larvae, and puparia – followed by the fourth life stage of the adult. Larvae develop in moist and rotting organic matter, so different stages of the fly have been found variously in the manures of cows, horses, and guinea pigs, in human waste and decaying heaps of vegetable waste, and in garden compost.

=== Larva ===
The larva has a length of 10 mm, a width of 2.75 mm, and a height of 2 mm. The body is dim yellow and tapers at both ends, at the false head and more narrowly at the posterior end, where the broadest part of the body is from the fifth to the ninth segment. A false head is a feature of the insect used to deflect predators' attack from its head. It is usually on the insect's tail, or the opposite end from its head. Moreover, the larva has white, microscopic hairs covered over its entire body. It also has three pairs of posterior fleshy processes, among which the first is the shortest and the last the longest, as well as seven pairs of prolegs, each of which has two dozen hooklets.

=== Puparium ===
The puparium has a length of 6.8 mm, a width of 2.95 mm, and a height of 2.68 mm. It is of colours yellowish white and dull brown, with an elongated oval body shape. It maintains remnants of the three pairs of posterior fleshy processes from the larval stage; however, the prolegs disappear.

== Food resources ==
Larval forms of Syritta pipiens feed on decaying organic matter.

Adult flies feed on the flowers of water-willow (Dianthera americana L.), white vervain (Verbena urticifolia L.), American pokeweed (Phytolacca decandra L.), and candyleaf (Stevia rebaudiana). They pollinate bluebell flowers (Campanula rotundifolia L.), which is a perennial herbaceous plant, with blue flowers.

List of flowers they also visit: Achillea, Allium, Aster, Calluna, Cardamine, Cirsium palustre, Convolvulus, Crataegus, Epilobium, Euphorbia, Galium, Jasione montana, Leontodon, Polygonum cuspidatum, Potentilla erecta, Prunus laurocerasus, Ranunculus, Rosa canina, Senecio jacobaea, Sorbus aucuparia, Tussilago.

== Enemies ==
=== Predators ===
Syritta pipiens is eaten by Pennsylvania ambush bug (Phymata pennsylvanica). It is also suspected to be a prey of willow flycatchers, as the flies have been found in the birds' fecal samples. Flower flies are likely to be a prey of flycatchers, because they occur in high abundance across seasons and are active in early mornings when flycatchers like to feed.

=== Parasites ===
Syrphids experience parasitism at the larval stage of development. Nearly 60% of parasitism in syrphid larvae are by parasitic wasps such as Diplazon sp. and Pachyneuron sp., which oviposit their eggs into the larval bodies.

== Social behavior ==
=== Flight ===
Syritta pipiens flies at a very low height, rarely more than 1 m (3 ft 3 in) above ground. Adult flies sometimes cruise around ignoring other flies, but males sometimes turn towards other flies, circle around them and make sudden darts if they are females, attempting to force copulations with them. More specifically, males point their heads at the target and move rapidly in an arc centered around the target fly they are tracking, even when the target fly settles. When the target fly is another male, the two males may oscillate sideways while both try to track the other fly; they may also signal to other male fly that they are of the same sex by meeting them head on in flight.

Hovering flight

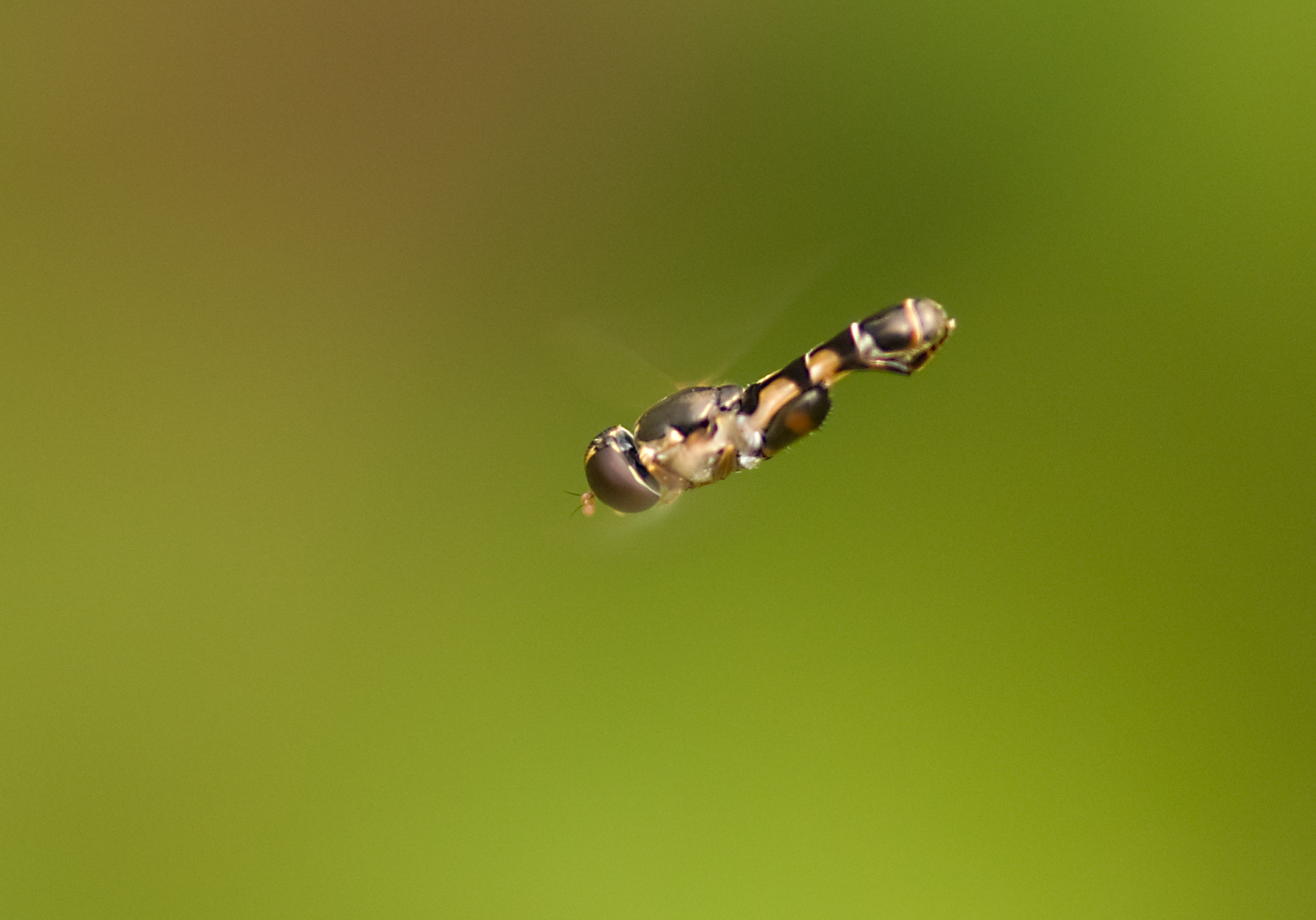

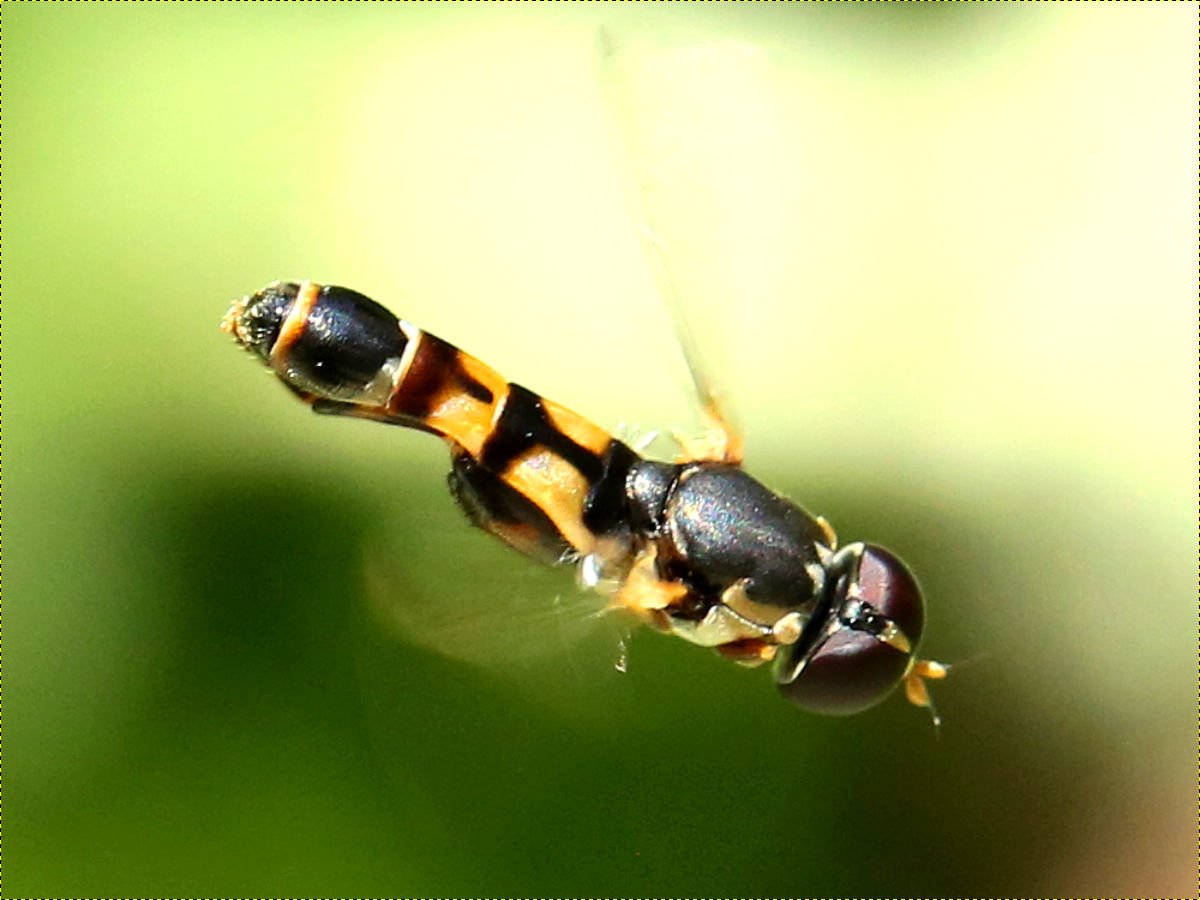

=== Mating ===
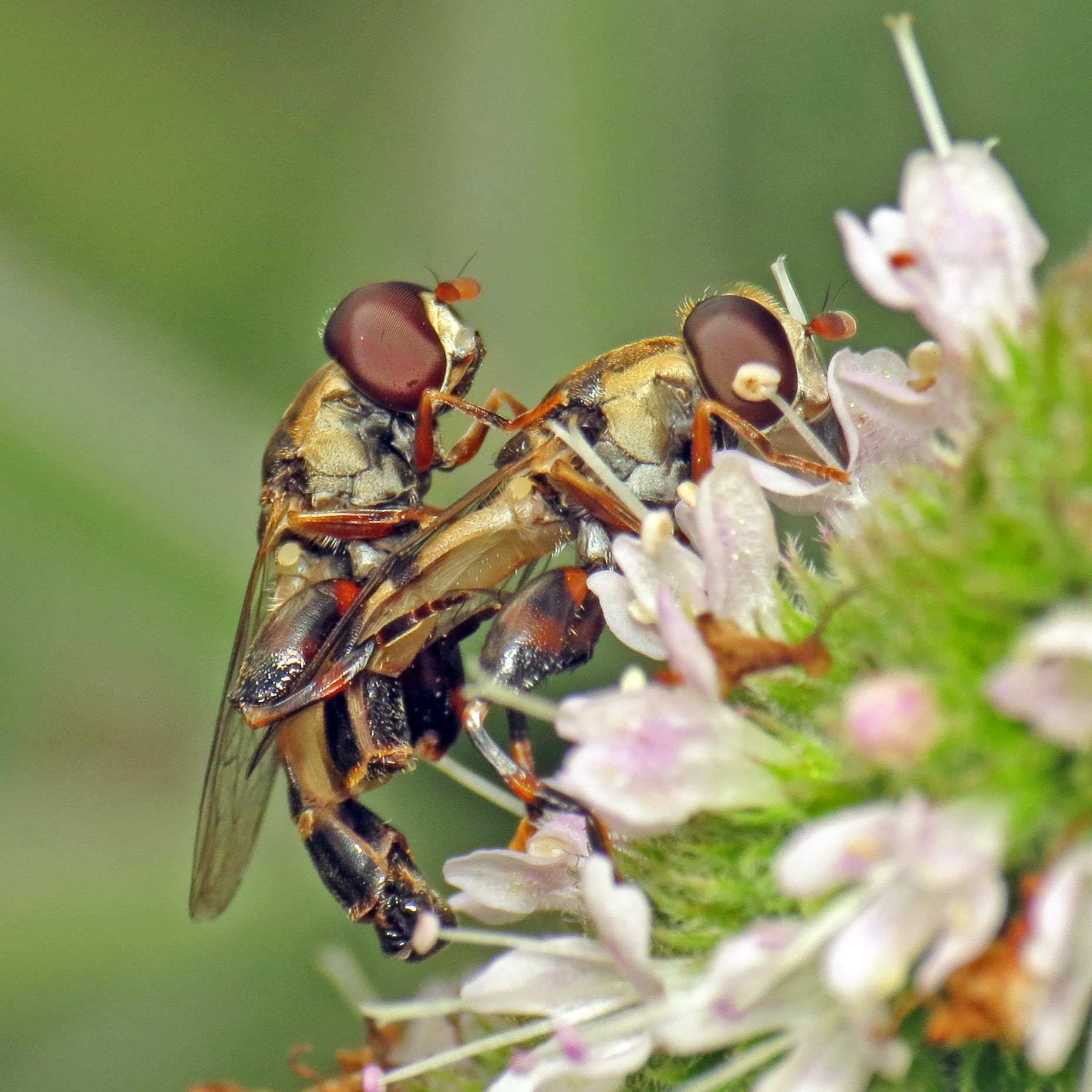
Syritta pipiens couple

Males' tracking behavior in flight potentially serves as a function for mating, as such behavior often ends with a sharp dart towards the target fly after it has settled. During those rapid movements, the male fly maintains an acceleration rate at about 500 cm/s^{2} until just before it lands and is prepared for copulation. In this way, males accurately track females, aiming to attempt forced copulation. Males Syritta pipiens also use motion camouflage when they approach female, so as to remain cryptic and become more successful in forcing copulation.

== Relation to humans ==
Flower flies (the family Syrphidae) are critical and one of the most common bio-control agents of plant pests because their larvae feed on aphids. As one of the exceptions, Syritta pipiens specializes in organic waste, leaving the predation to other members of the family.

They are also recyclers of plant and animal debris, important pollinators a variety of common plants, as well as pests for certain ornamental plants. Because they play an important role in supporting the functionality of the environment, flower flies also serve as bio-indicators of environmental health, demonstrating the effects of climate change on pollinators. Their abundance is closely linked to agricultural landscapes and arable lands and is contingent upon the density of flowering plants available. Thus, landscape changes can very easily have an impact on the organism's density, and result in further cascades of consequences.
