= Macrocephalus =

Scientific classification
- Kingdom: Animalia
- Phylum: Arthropoda
- Clade: Pancrustacea
- Class: Insecta
- Order: Hemiptera
- Suborder: Heteroptera
- Family: Reduviidae
- Subfamily: Phymatinae
- Tribe: Macrocephalini
- Genus: Macrocephalus; Swederus, 1787

Genus of true bugs

Macrocephalus (meaning "large head") is a genus of ambush bugs in the family Reduviidae. There are more than 30 described species in Macrocephalus.

== Species ==
These 37 species belong to the genus Macrocephalus:

- Macrocephalus albinus Tigny, 1801
- Macrocephalus albirostris Tigny, 1801
- Macrocephalus angustus Westwood, 1842
- Macrocephalus arizonicus Cockerell, 1900
- Macrocephalus barberi Evans, 1931
- Macrocephalus bidens Olivier, 1795
- Macrocephalus bimaculatus Olivier, 1795
- Macrocephalus cacao Olivier, 1795
- Macrocephalus cimicoides Swederus, 1787
- Macrocephalus coffeae Billberg, 1820
- Macrocephalus cylindricornis Westwood, 1842
- Macrocephalus dorannae Evans, 1931
- Macrocephalus elongatus Lacordaire, 1830
- Macrocephalus fasciatus Olivier, 1795
- Macrocephalus gracilis Handlirsch, 1897
- Macrocephalus hieroglyphicus Hope, 1831
- Macrocephalus leucographus Klug, 1842
- Macrocephalus longicornis Billberg, 1820
- Macrocephalus lugubris Olivier, 1795
- Macrocephalus macilentus Westwood, 1842
- Macrocephalus manicatus (Fabricius, 1803)
- Macrocephalus marmoreus Olivier, 1795
- Macrocephalus murinus Olivier, 1795
- Macrocephalus niveirostris Olivier, 1795
- Macrocephalus notatus (Westwood, 1841)
- Macrocephalus obscurus Westwood, 1842
- Macrocephalus pallidus Westwood, 1842
- Macrocephalus pulchellus Klug, 1842
- Macrocephalus punctatostriatus Billberg, 1820
- Macrocephalus quadratus Westwood, 1842
- Macrocephalus rhombiventris Westwood, 1842
- Macrocephalus scriptus Billberg, 1820
- Macrocephalus similis Kormilev, 1972
- Macrocephalus tuberculatus Olivier, 1795
- Macrocephalus tuberosus Klug, 1842
- Macrocephalus uhleri Handlirsch, 1898
- Macrocephalus undulatus Billberg, 1820
