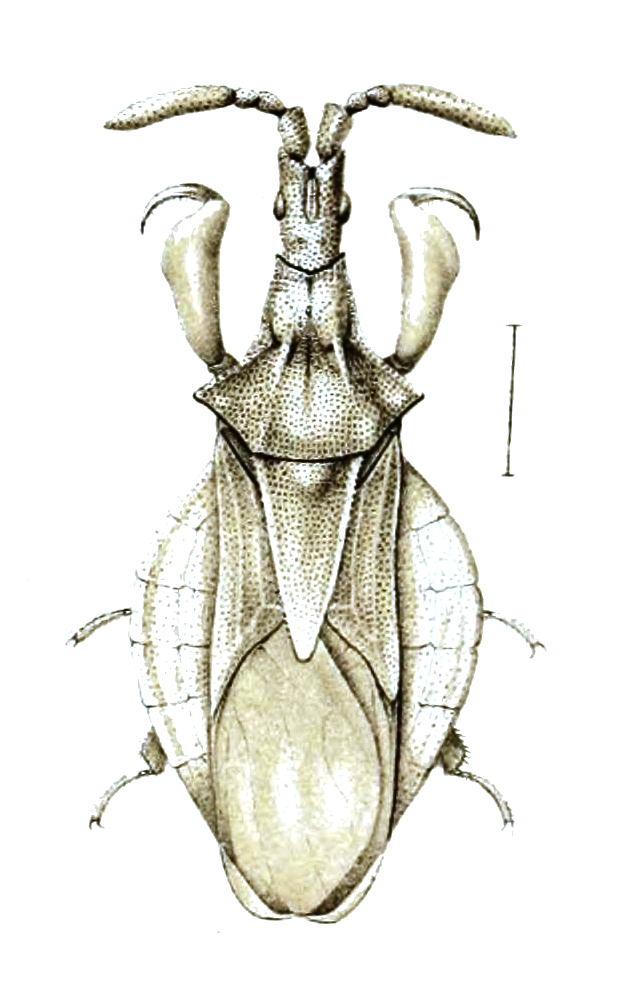
- O. cylindricornis

Scientific classification
- Kingdom: Animalia
- Phylum: Arthropoda
- Class: Insecta
- Order: Hemiptera
- Suborder: Heteroptera
- Family: Reduviidae
- Tribe: Macrocephalini
- Genus: Oxythyreus; Westwood, 1841

Type species
- Oxythyreus cylinricornis

= Oxythyreus =

Genus of true bugs

Oxythyreus is a genus of ambush bugs. Species in this genus are known only from southern Africa.

Species include:

- Oxythyreus slateri Doesburg & Pluot-Sigwalt, 2007
- Oxythyreus ruckesi Kormilev, 1962
- Oxythyreus cylindricornis Westwood, 1841
  - O. c. schuhi Doesburg & Pluot-Sigwalt, 2007
