= Lophoscutus =

Scientific classification
- Kingdom: Animalia
- Phylum: Arthropoda
- Class: Insecta
- Order: Hemiptera
- Suborder: Heteroptera
- Family: Reduviidae
- Subfamily: Phymatinae
- Tribe: Macrocephalini
- Genus: Lophoscutus; Kormilev, 1951

Genus of true bugs

Lophoscutus is a genus of ambush bugs in the family Reduviidae. There are more than 60 described species in Lophoscutus.

== Species ==
These 61 species belong to the genus Lophoscutus:

- Lophoscutus acunai (Bruner, 1946)
- Lophoscutus affinis (Guérin-Méneville, 1838)
- Lophoscutus alayoi (Zayas, 1966)
- Lophoscutus armatus Kormilev, 1986
- Lophoscutus arnaudi Kormilev, 1988
- Lophoscutus asper (Stål, 1876)
- Lophoscutus aterrimus (Kormilev, 1981)
- Lophoscutus attenuatus (Champion, 1898)
- Lophoscutus balloui (Bruner, 1926)
- Lophoscutus bergrothi (Handlirsch, 1897)
- Lophoscutus brasiliensis Kormilev & van Doesburg, 1986
- Lophoscutus chemsaki Kormilev, 1984
- Lophoscutus confusus Kormilev, 1989-31
- Lophoscutus crassimanus (Fabricius, 1803)
- Lophoscutus dimorphus Kormilev, 1986
- Lophoscutus dominicanus (Kormilev, 1963)
- Lophoscutus dudichi (Kormilev, 1949)
- Lophoscutus froeschneri Kormilev, 1987
- Lophoscutus geijskesi Kormilev & van Doesburg, 1986
- Lophoscutus granulatus (Champion, 1898)
- Lophoscutus haitiensis Kormilev, 1987
- Lophoscutus hispaniolensis Kormilev & van Doesburg, 1991-24
- Lophoscutus inaequalis (Champion, 1898)
- Lophoscutus insignis (Kormilev, 1957)
- Lophoscutus insularis (Dudich, 1922)
- Lophoscutus israeli (Zayas, 1966)
- Lophoscutus julianus (Bruner, 1951)
- Lophoscutus kormilevi (Zayas, 1966)
- Lophoscutus lepidus (Stål, 1862)
- Lophoscutus leucographus (Westwood, 1843)
- Lophoscutus macilentus (Westwood, 1841)
- Lophoscutus margaritis (Kormilev, 1962)
- Lophoscutus marmoratus (Kormilev, 1966)
- Lophoscutus maurus Kormilev, 1989-01
- Lophoscutus michelbacheri Kormilev, 1984
- Lophoscutus mopsus (Handlirsch, 1897)
- Lophoscutus paracrassimanus Kormilev, 1988
- Lophoscutus paraspiculosus (Kormilev, 1953)
- Lophoscutus parvulus (Handlirsch, 1897)
- Lophoscutus patriciae (Zayas, 1966)
- Lophoscutus prehensilis (Fabricius, 1803)
- Lophoscutus productus (Barber, 1939)
- Lophoscutus pugil Kormilev & van Doesburg, 1992-31
- Lophoscutus pulchellus (Westwood, 1841)
- Lophoscutus pulcher (Kormilev, 1981)
- Lophoscutus rideri Kormilev, 1988
- Lophoscutus rileyorum Kormilev, 1990-30
- Lophoscutus rugosipes (Guérin-Méneville, 1857)
- Lophoscutus sagimani Kormilev & van Doesburg, 1986
- Lophoscutus schaffneri Kormilev, 1986
- Lophoscutus spiculissimus (Barber, 1939)
- Lophoscutus subproductus (Kormilev, 1962)
- Lophoscutus subsimilis (Dudich, 1922)
- Lophoscutus thoracicus (Valdés, 1910)
- Lophoscutus vesiculosus (Handlirsch, 1897)
- Lophoscutus virginensis Kormilev, 1986
- Lophoscutus viridis Kormilev, 1984
- Lophoscutus westwoodi (Guérin-Méneville, 1857)
- Lophoscutus woolleyi Kormilev, 1988
- Lophoscutus wygodzinskyi (Kormilev, 1949)
- Lophoscutus ypsilon Kormilev, 1990-30
