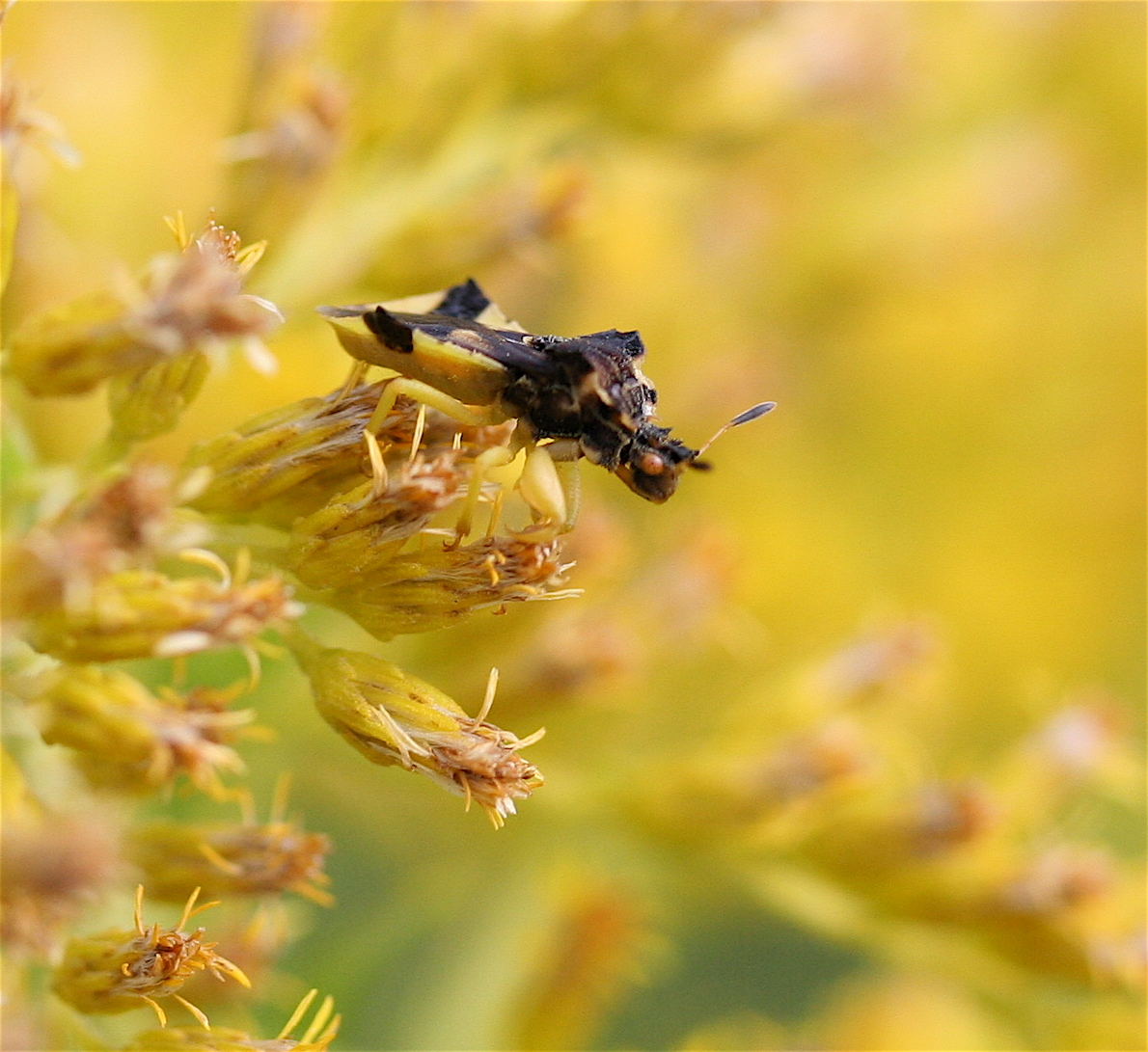

Scientific classification
- Domain: Eukaryota
- Kingdom: Animalia
- Phylum: Arthropoda
- Class: Insecta
- Order: Hemiptera
- Suborder: Heteroptera
- Family: Reduviidae
- Genus: Phymata
- Species: P. pennsylvanica

Binomial name
- Phymata pennsylvanica Handlirsch, 1897

= Phymata pennsylvanica =

Species of true bug

Phymata pennsylvanica, known generally as the Pennsylvania ambush bug or Pennsylvania jagged ambush bug, is a species of ambush bug in the family Reduviidae. It is found in North America. It is known to prey on a common hoverfly, Syritta pipiens.

== Gallery ==
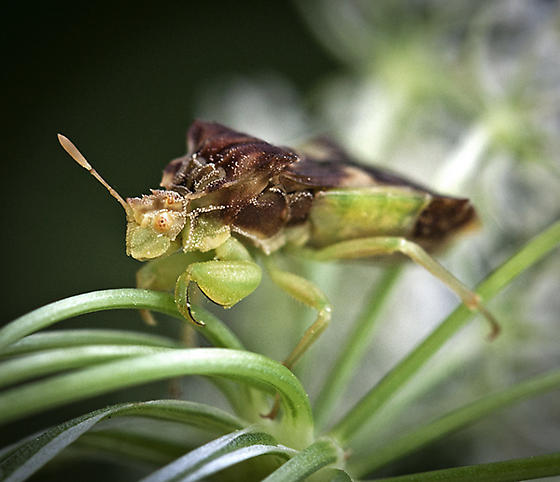
Pennsylvania jagged ambush bug (Phymata pennsylvanica)

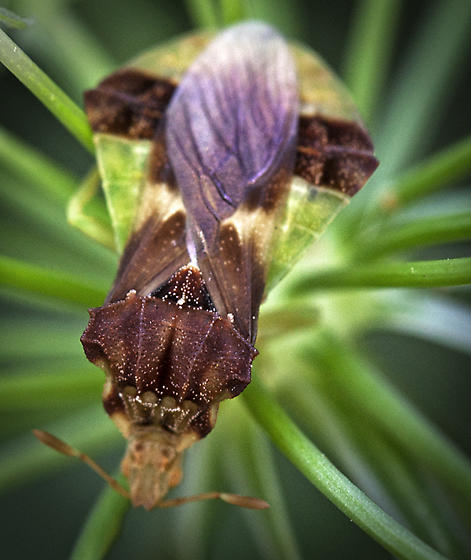
Pennsylvania jagged ambush bug (Phymata pennsylvanica) color variant dorsal view

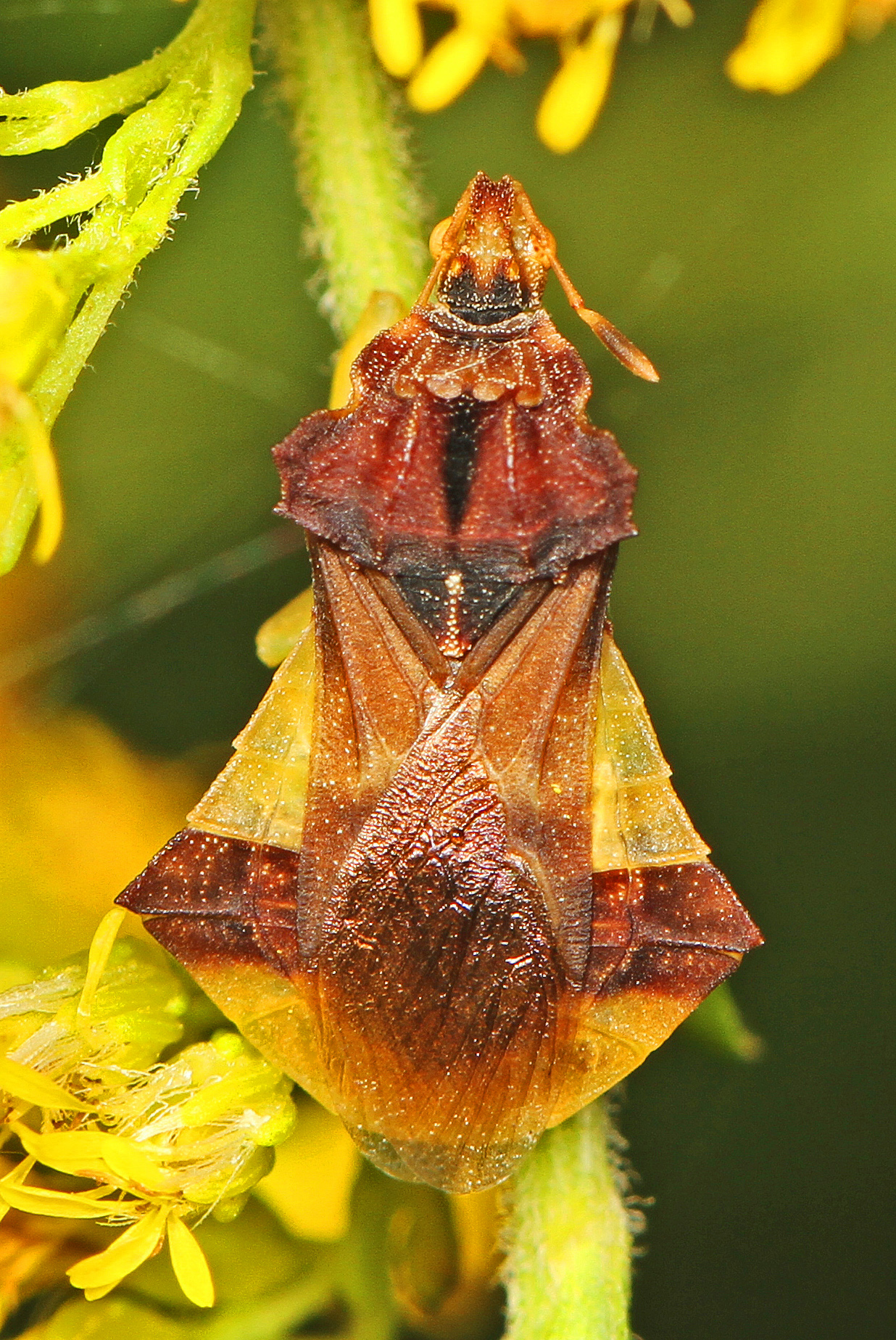
Pennsylvania ambush bug, Phymata pennsylvanica, dorsal view
