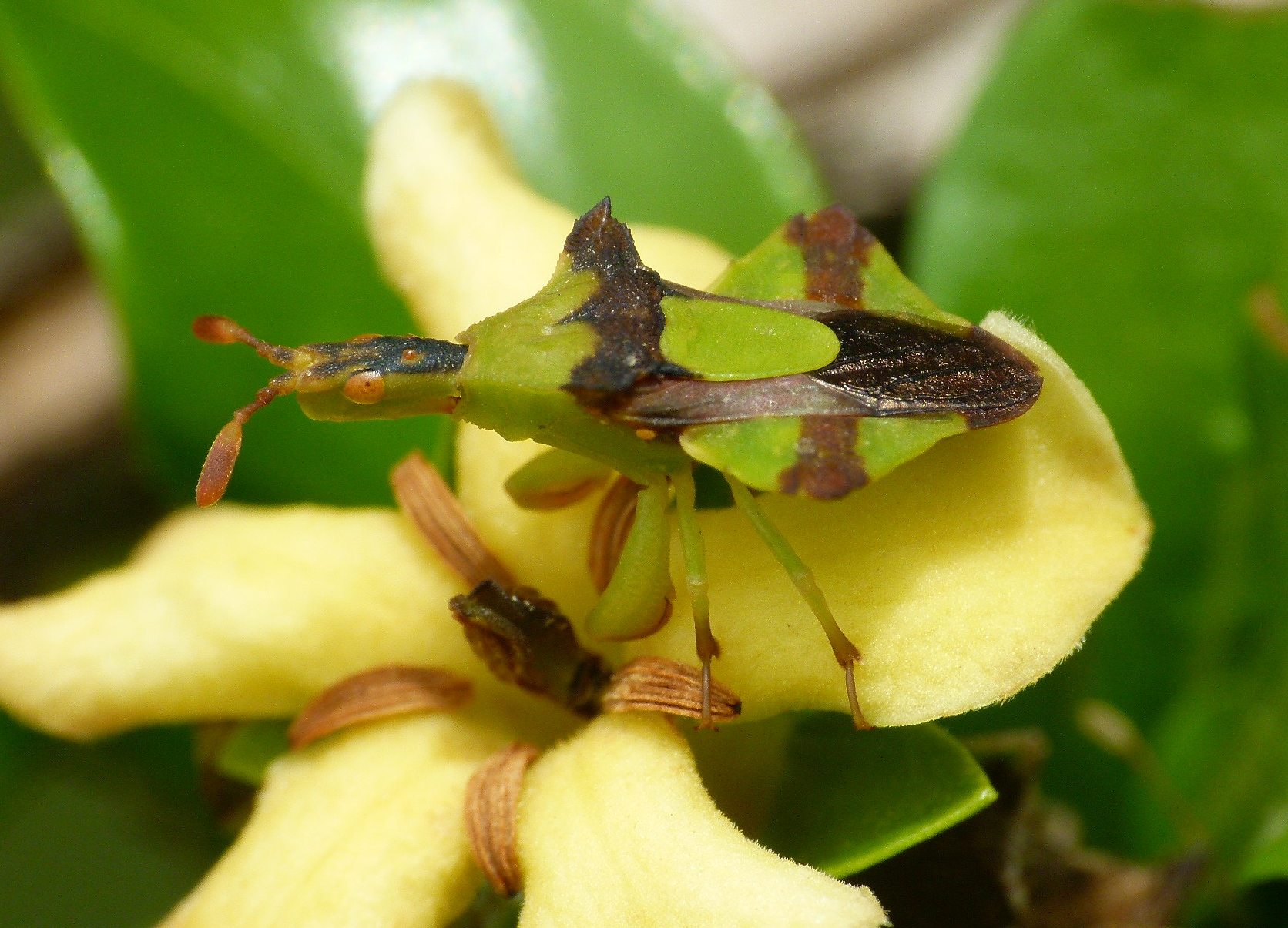
- Amblythyreus cf. intermedius

Scientific classification
- Kingdom: Animalia
- Phylum: Arthropoda
- Clade: Pancrustacea
- Class: Insecta
- Order: Hemiptera
- Suborder: Heteroptera
- Family: Reduviidae
- Subfamily: Phymatinae
- Genus: Amblythyreus; Westwood, 1843

= Amblythyreus =

Genus of true bugs

Amblythyreus is a genus of ambush bugs (Reduviidae: Phymatinae) found mainly in Asia with about 16 species. They are predators that lie in wait mainly in flowers, capturing prey using their forelegs.

Species in the genus include:

- Amblythyreus angustus (Westwood, 1842)
- Amblythyreus chapa Kormilev, 1962
- Amblythyreus esakii Maa & Lin, 1956
- Amblythyreus fasciatus (Dudich, 1922)
- Amblythyreus gestroi Handlirsch, 1897
- Amblythyreus intermedius Handlirsch, 1897
- Amblythyreus iranicus Hoberlandt, 1959
- Amblythyreus izzardi Kormilev, 1962
- Amblythyreus martini Handlirsch, 1899
- Amblythyreus oberthueri Handlirsch, 1899
- Amblythyreus potaninae (Bianchi, 1899)
- Amblythyreus quadratus (Westwood, 1841)
- Amblythyreus rectus Maa & Lin, 1956
- Amblythyreus rhombiventris (Westwood, 1841)
- Amblythyreus stali Handlirsch, 1897
- Amblythyreus taiwanus Sonan, 1935
