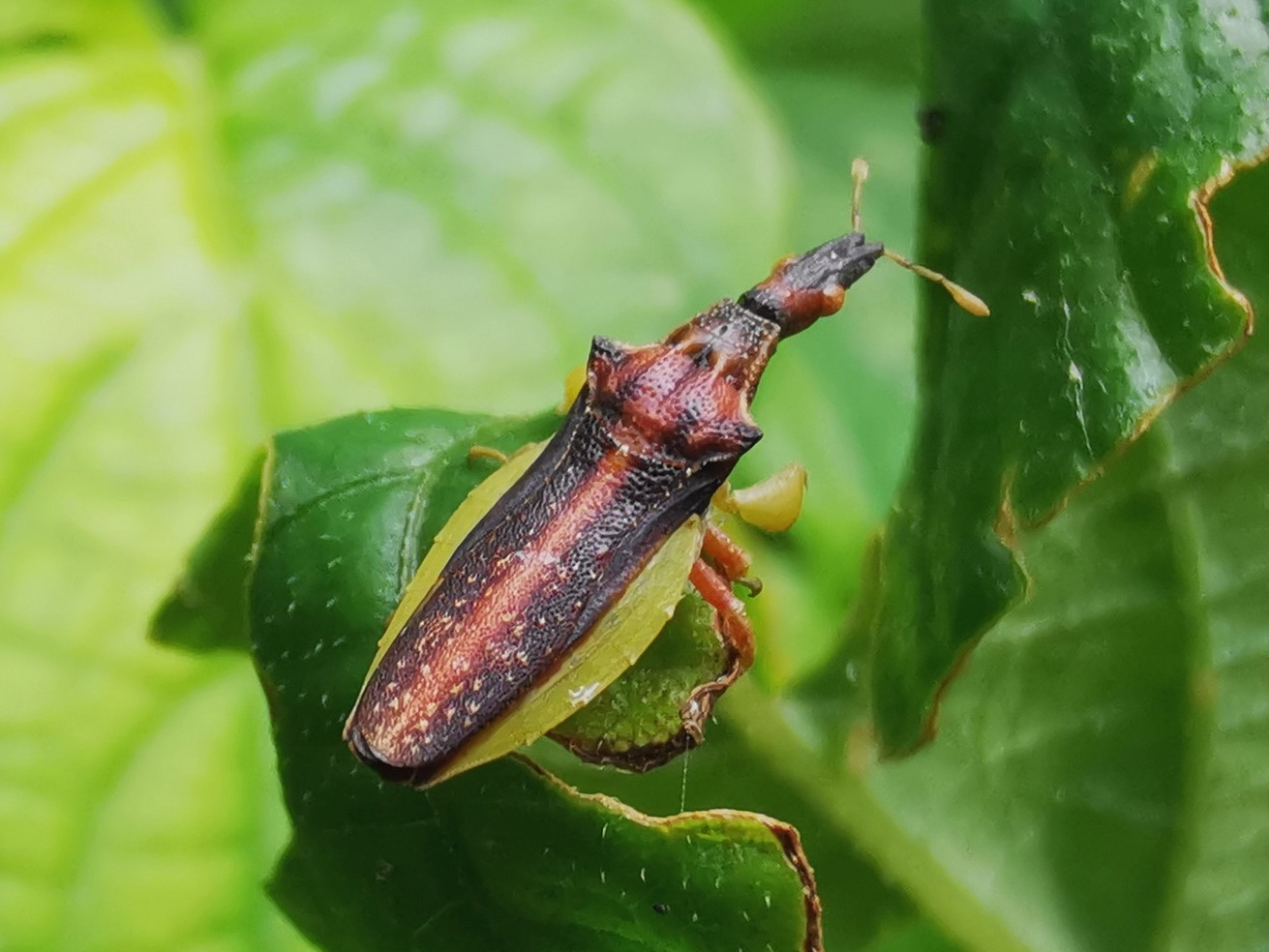
- Glossopelta sp.

Scientific classification
- Kingdom: Animalia
- Phylum: Arthropoda
- Class: Insecta
- Order: Hemiptera
- Suborder: Heteroptera
- Family: Reduviidae
- Subfamily: Phymatinae
- Tribe: Macrocephalini; Handlirsch, 1897

= Macrocephalini =

Tribe of true bugs

Macrocephalini is a tribe of ambush bugs in the assassin bug family Reduviidae.

Species of the tribe have a largely tropical distribution.

== Genera ==
The following are included in BioLib.cz:

1. Agdistocoris Kormilev, 1962
2. Agreuocoris Handlirsch, 1897
3. Amblythyreus Westwood, 1841
4. Bakerinia Kormilev, 1962
5. Cnizocoris Handlirsch, 1897
6. Diurocoris Maa & Lin, 1956
7. Doesburgella Rédei & Jindra, 2013
8. Eurymnus Bergroth, 1917
9. Extraneza Barber, 1939
10. Glossopelta Handlirsch, 1897
11. Goellneriana van Doesburg, 2004
12. Hoberlandtiana Kormilev & van Doesberg, 1986
13. Kormilevida van Doesburg, 1997
14. Lophoscutus Kormilev, 1951
15. Macrocephalus Swederus, 1787
16. Metagreuocoris Villiers, 1965
17. Narina Distant, 1906
18. Oxythyreus Westwood, 1841
19. Parabotha Kormilev, 1984
20. Paragreuocoris Carayon, 1949
21. Paroxythyreus Jacobs, 2025
