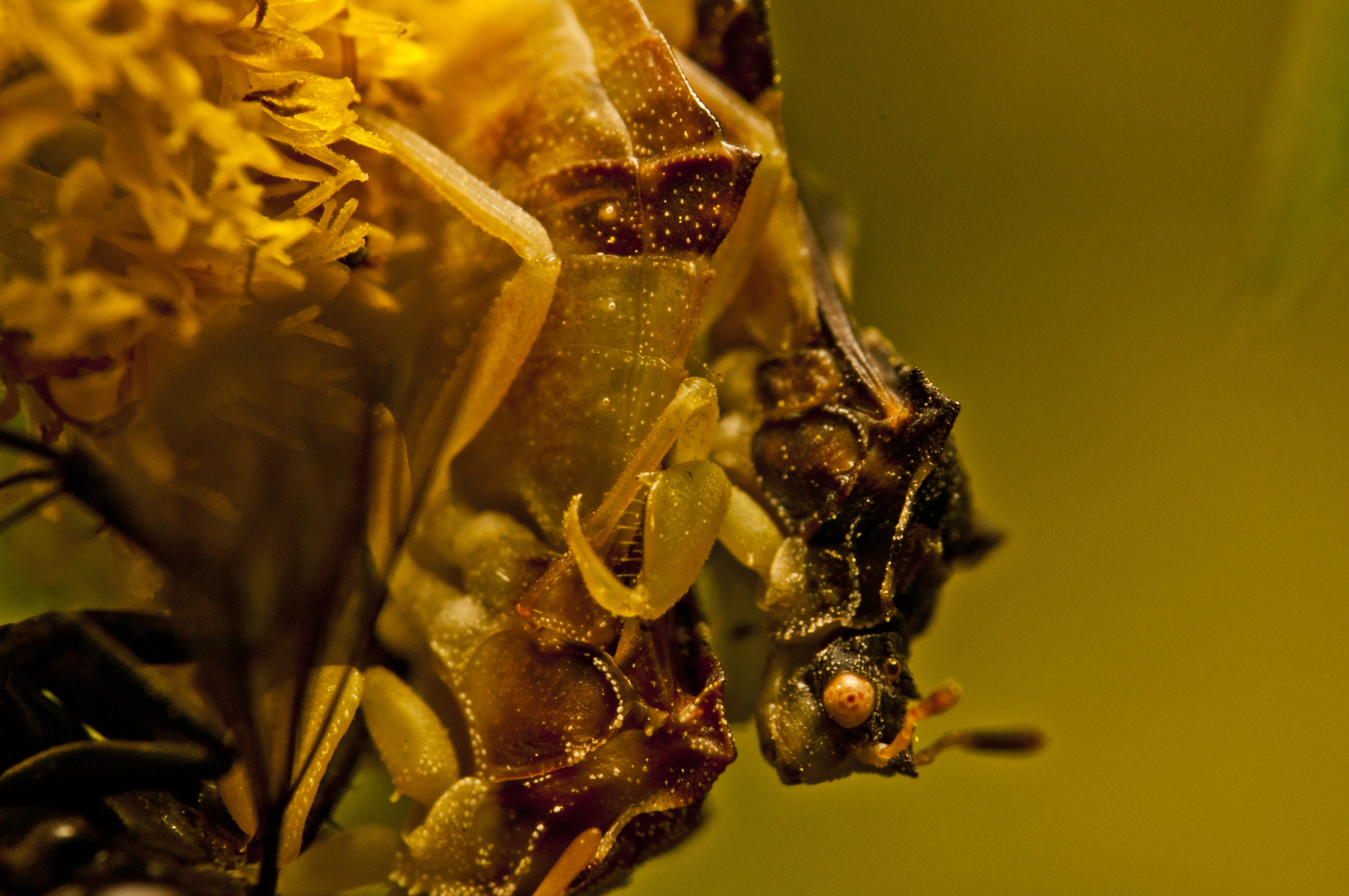
- Phymata sp.

Scientific classification
- Kingdom: Animalia
- Phylum: Arthropoda
- Class: Insecta
- Order: Hemiptera
- Suborder: Heteroptera
- Family: Reduviidae
- Subfamily: Phymatinae; Laporte, 1832

Tribes
- Carcinocorini; Macrocephalini; Phymatini; Themonocorini

= Phymatinae =

Subfamily of true bugs

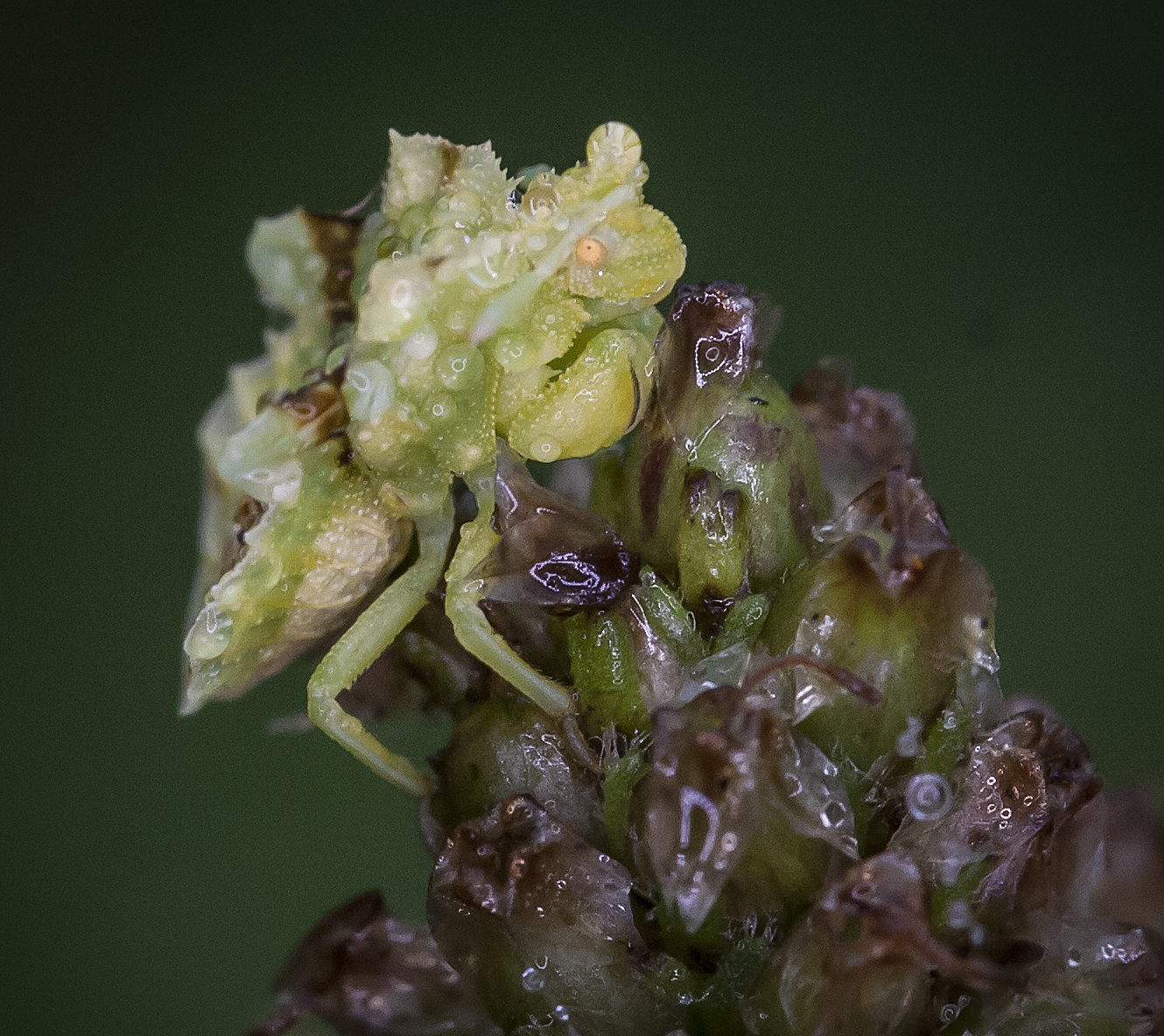
Ambush bug (Phymata sp.)

Insects in the subfamily Phymatinae are commonly called ambush bugs after their habit of lying in wait for prey, relying on their superb camouflage. Armed with raptorial forelegs, ambush bugs routinely capture prey ten or more times their own size. They form a subgroup within the assassin bugs.

== Description ==
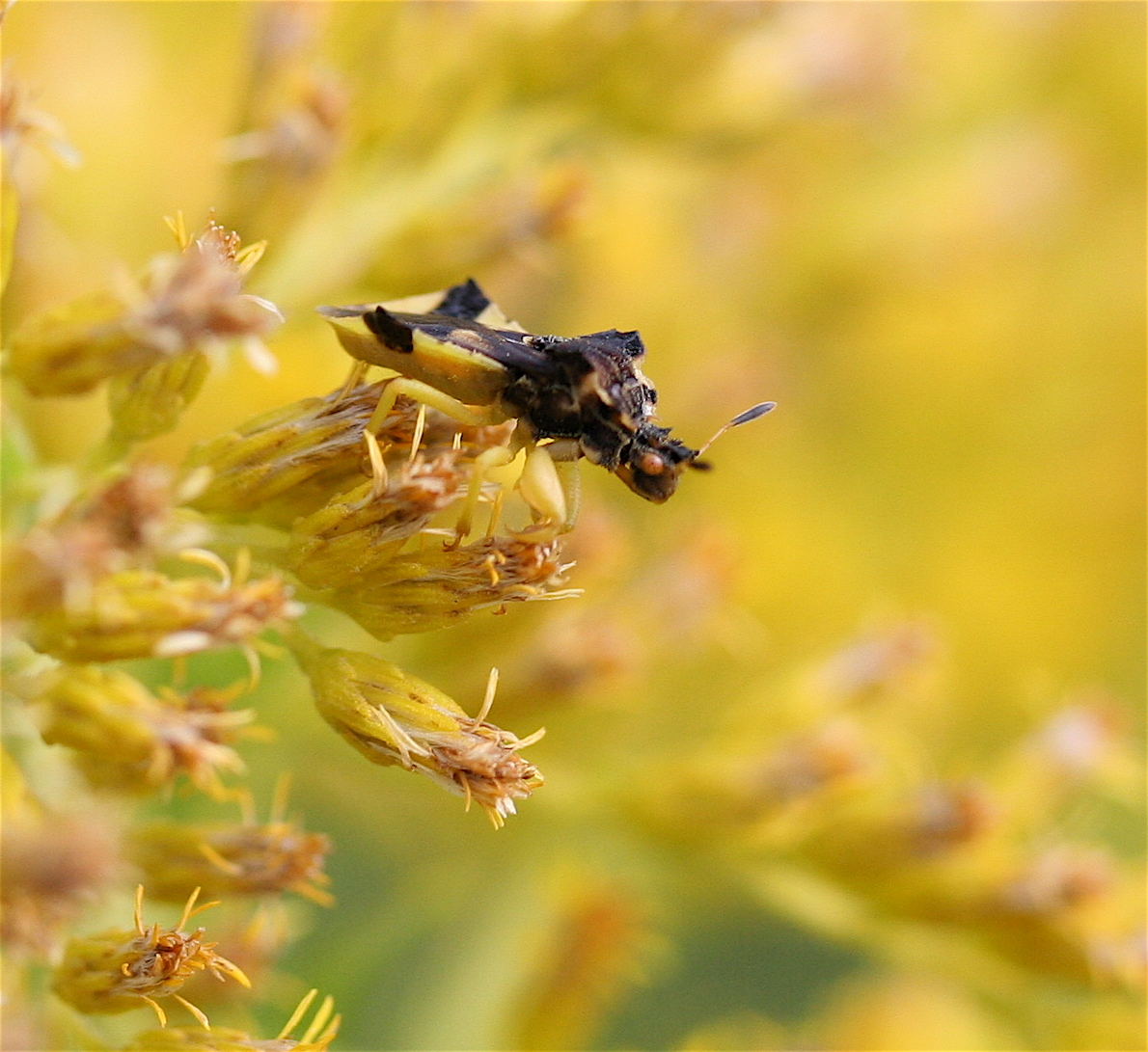
Phymata pennsylvanica

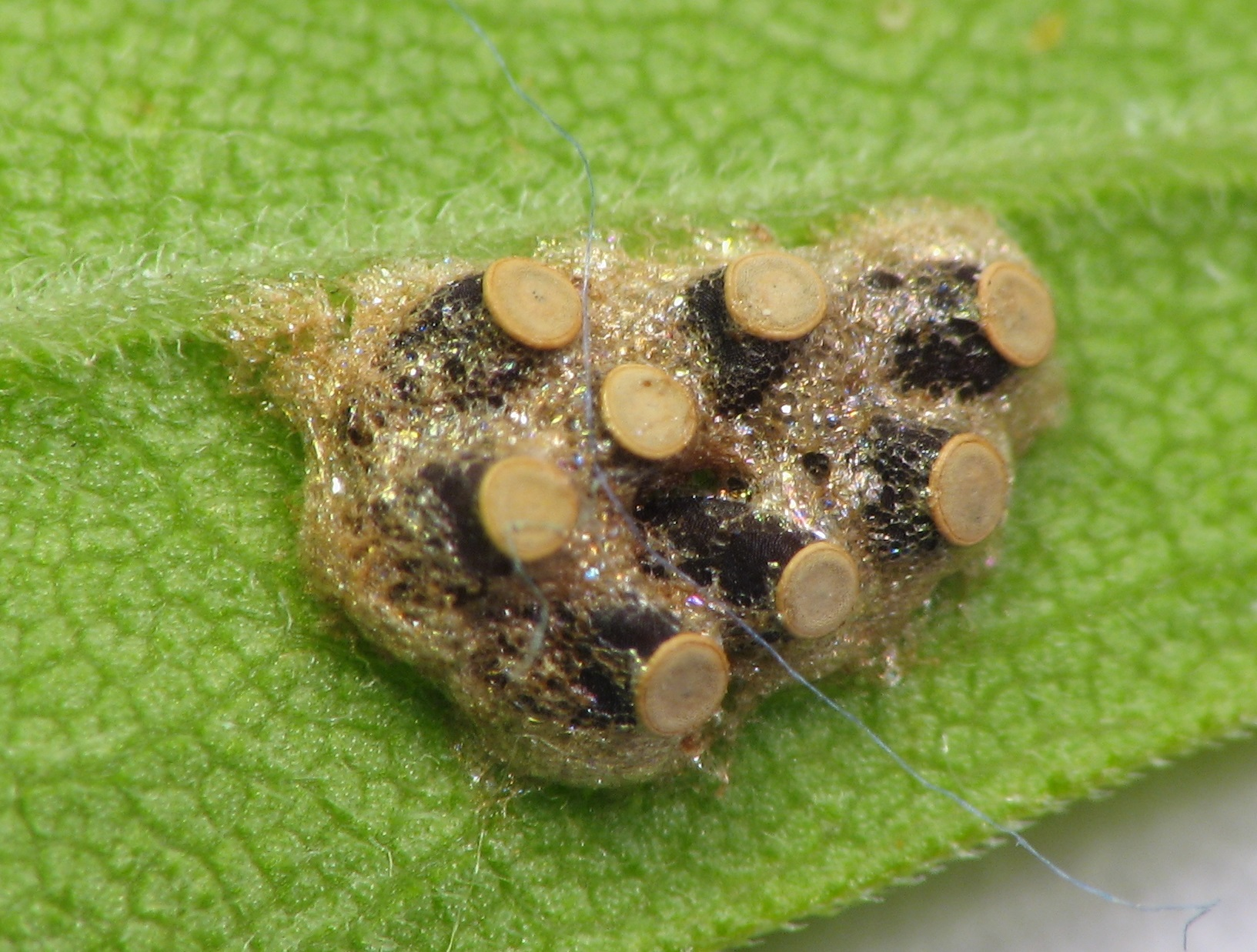
Phymata sp. eggs

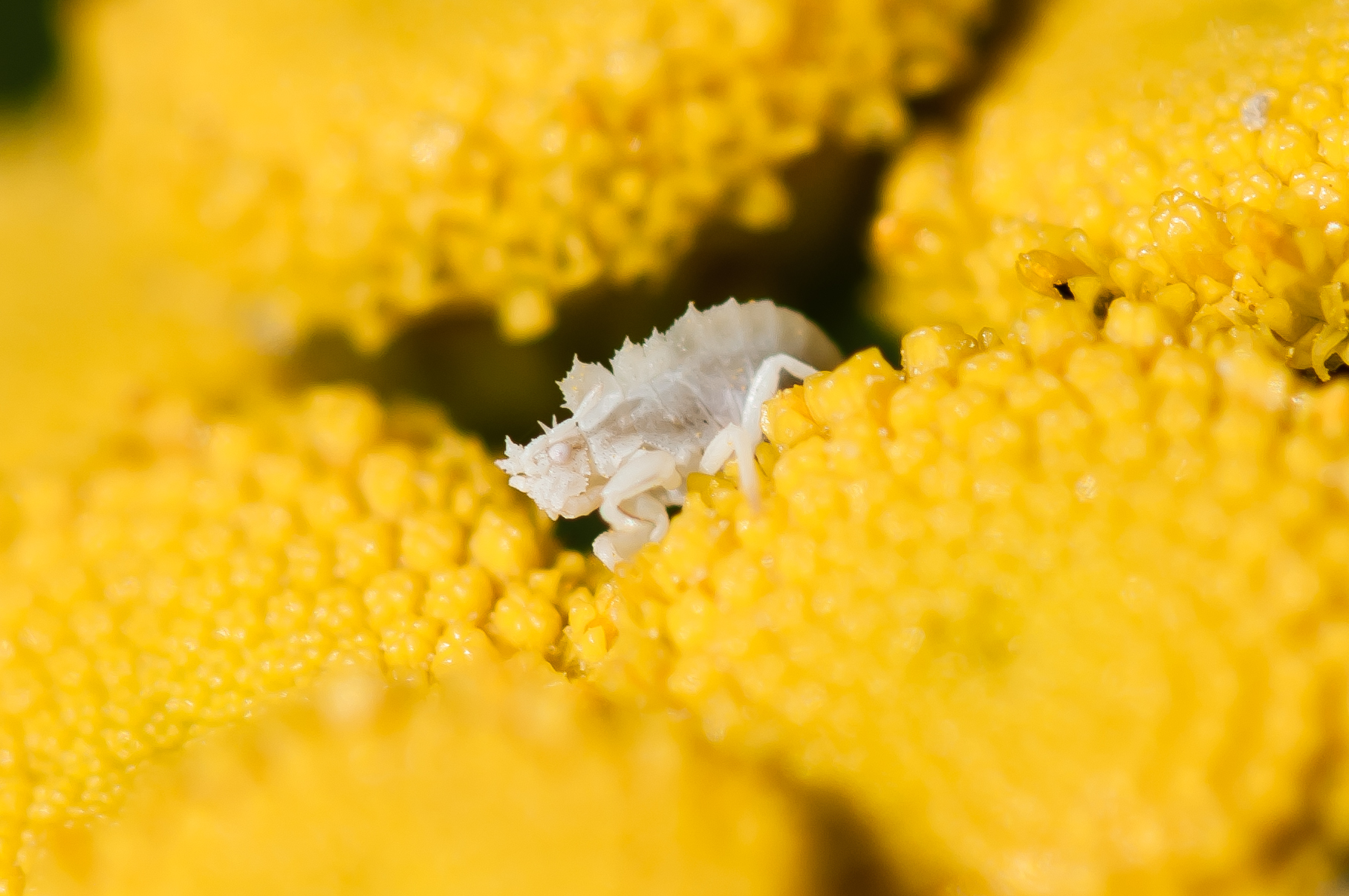
Ambush bug nymph

Phymatinae are 5–12 mm (0.20–0.47 in) long. The most distinguishable trait of this group is the presence of pronounced raptorial forelegs. In Phymata, the scutellum is triangular and shorter than the pronotum. In Macrocephalus, the scutellum is narrow and rounded, extending to the tip of the abdomen.

Phymatinae normally have a large fore femur and clubbed antennae. The forewing membranes sometimes lack distinct cells.

The antennae have four segments. There are two ocelli. The beak has three segments. The tarsi also have three segments. The rear half of the abdomen expands beyond the edges of the wings.

Compared to classic assassin bugs, ambush bugs are shorter, stouter, more colorful, and have larger heads in proportion to their bodies. It is hypothesized that the coloration of these insects is an adaptation to allow them to camouflage within their environment, specifically an evolutionary effort to blend in with the flowers of their host plant.

Ambush bugs can be found in tropical, subtropical, and temperate regions all over the world, excluding Australia and New Zealand.

== Etymology ==
The name Phymatinae is derived from the Greek phymata, meaning "swollen", which presumably refers to the enlarged abdomen and femora.

== Taxonomy ==
Ambush bugs are insects in the order Hemiptera, or "true bugs". They occupy the family Reduviidae, and form the subfamily Phymatinae. This subfamily was often given family-level status and this classification is still used in some textbooks. Based on cladistic analyses, however, ambush bugs (Phymatinae) are a type of assassin bug (Reduviidae). Approximately 300 species have been documented, and they are a sister group of the Holoptilinae. The genera of ambush bugs are separated into four tribes, but this separation is based purely on phenotypic similarities rather than molecular data. The exact relationships between different groups of Phymatinae are understudied, and there are likely species yet to be discovered.

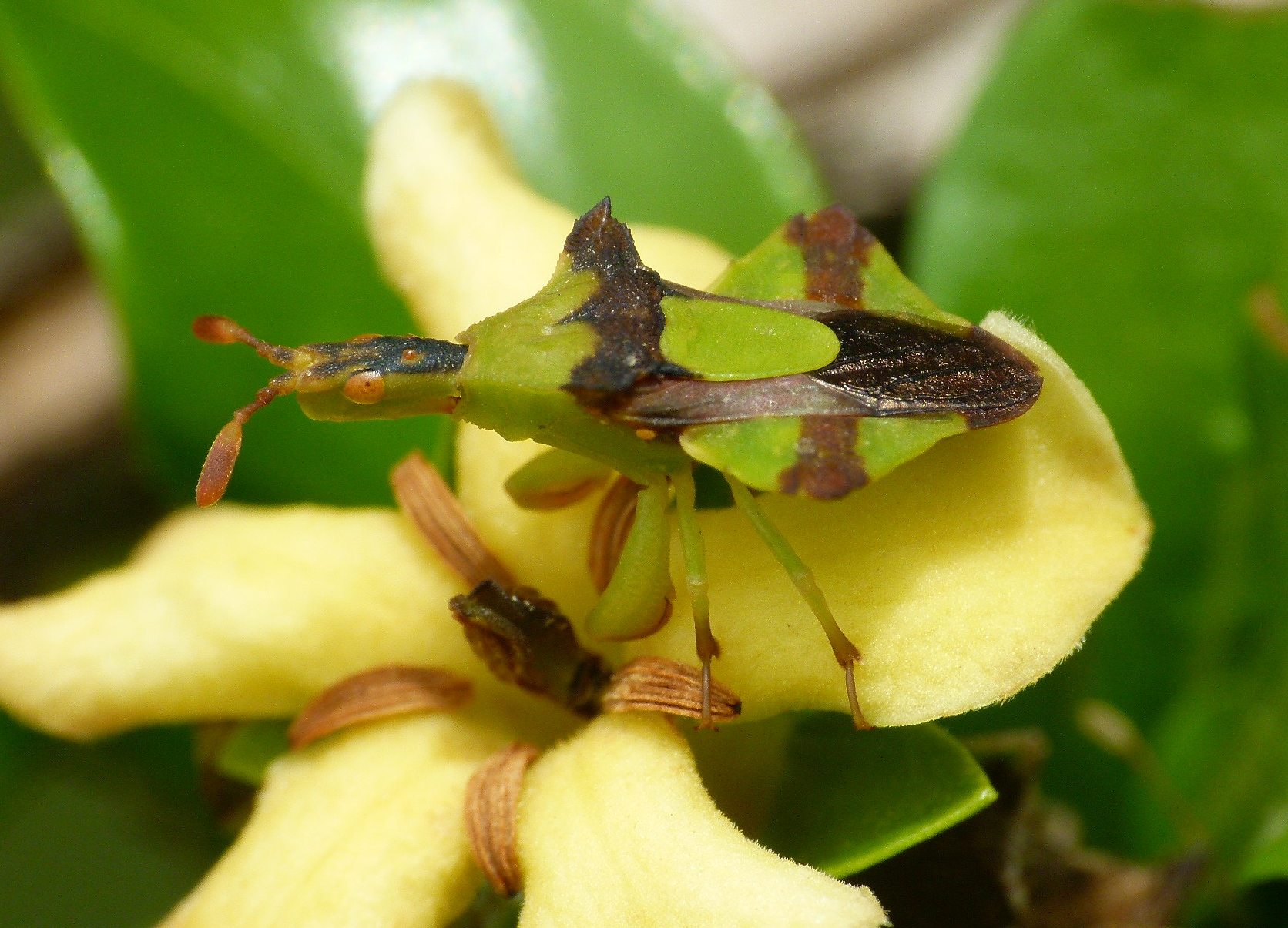
Amblythyreus cf. intermedius from India

The Phymatinae are currently separated into four tribes:

Carcinocorini Handlirsch, 1897

Includes:

- Carcinocoris Handlirsch, 1897

Macrocephalini Handlirsch, 1897

- Amblythyreus Westwood, 1841
- Lophoscutus Kormilev, 1951
- Macrocephalus Swederus, 1787
- Oxythyreus Westwood, 1841

=== Phymatini ===
Auth. Laporte, 1832; all genera:

1. Anthylla (beetle) Stål, 1876
2. Kelainocoris Kormilev, 1963
3. Neoanthylla Kormilev, 1951
4. Paraphymata Kormilev, 1962
5. Phymata Latreille, 1802

=== Themonocorini ===
Auth. Carayon, Usinger & Wygodzinsky, 1958

1. Themonocoris Carayon, Usinger & Wygodzinsky, 1958
2. †Koenigsbergia Popov, 2003

== Behaviour ==
Ambush bugs occupy a similar niche to that of the crab spider, camouflaged with their host plant and lying in wait for pollinators and other invertebrate prey to come within range. These hemipterans often attack prey many times larger than themselves, which they subdue with an immobilizing venom.

Adult Phymata sp. attempting its lie in wait technique to ambush a syrphid fly (Orthonevra nitida) and a Halictus bee

Adult Phymata sp. catches a Halictus bee.

Adult Phymata sp. catches a much larger honey bee.

Ambush bugs attempting mating
