= Gompholobium karijini =

Conservation status
- Priority Two — Poorly Known Taxa (DEC)

Scientific classification
- Kingdom: Plantae
- Clade: Tracheophytes
- Clade: Angiosperms
- Clade: Eudicots
- Clade: Rosids
- Order: Fabales
- Family: Fabaceae
- Subfamily: Faboideae
- Genus: Gompholobium
- Species: G. karijini

Binomial name
- Gompholobium karijini Chappill

Species of flowering plant

Gompholobium karijini is a species of flowering plant in the family Fabaceae and is endemic to the north-west of Western Australia. It is an erect, openly-branched shrub with pinnate leaves with five to ten pairs of leaflets, and racemes of yellow to orange and creamy-yellow, pea-like flowers.

== Description ==
Gompholobium karijini is an erect shrub that typically grows to 40–70 cm (16–28 in) high and up to 1.3 m (4 ft 3 in) wide with more or less glabrous branchlets. Its leaves are pinnate with five to ten pairs of elliptic to egg-shaped leaflets that are 4–6.5 mm (0.16–0.26 in) long and 2.5–5 mm (0.098–0.197 in) wide. The leaves are on a petiole 0.6–2.1 mm (0.024–0.083 in) long with stipules 1.5–3 mm (0.059–0.118 in) long at the base, and the leaflets are on petiolules 0.5–0.6 mm (0.020–0.024 in) long. The flowers are borne on racemes of four to more than one hundred, on a peduncle 3.5–20 mm (0.14–0.79 in) long, each flower on a pedicel 5–8 mm (0.20–0.31 in) long. There are bracts and bracteoles that fall at the bud stage. The sepals are fused at the base with lobes 5.3–6.6 mm (0.21–0.26 in) long. The standard petal and wings are yellow to orange and 10–11 mm (0.39–0.43 in) long, and the keel creamy yellow and 9.5–12 mm (0.37–0.47 in) long. Flowering occurs in January and from August to September and the fruit is a pod about 7 mm (0.28 in) long.

== Taxonomy ==
Gompholobium karijini was first formally described in 2008 by Jennifer Anne Chappill in Australian Systematic Botany from specimens collected in Hamersley Gorge in Karijini National Park in 1991. The specific epithet (karijini) refers to the type location.

The original description included features that apply to the more recently described G. oreophilum.

== Distribution and habitat ==
This pea grows in grassland with scattered trees and shrubs and is only known from Karijini National Park in the Pilbara region of north-western Western Australia.

== Conservation status ==
Gompholobium karijini is classified as "Priority Two" by the Western Australian Government Department of Parks and Wildlife meaning that it is poorly known and from only one or a few locations.
