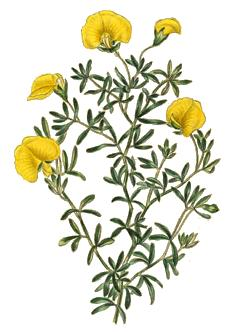
- Gompholobium virgatum

Scientific classification
- Kingdom: Plantae
- Clade: Tracheophytes
- Clade: Angiosperms
- Clade: Eudicots
- Clade: Rosids
- Order: Fabales
- Family: Fabaceae
- Subfamily: Faboideae
- Clade: Mirbelioids
- Genus: Gompholobium; Sm.

Type species
- Gompholobium grandiflorum Sm.

Species
- See text.

Synonyms
- Burtonia R.Br. ex W.T.Aiton 1811

= Gompholobium =

Genus of legumes

Gompholobium, commonly known as glory peas or wedge-peas, is a genus of plants in the pea family Fabaceae and is endemic to Australia. Most species have compound leaves composed of three leaflets and all have ten stamens which are free from each other and a distinctive arrangement of their sepals.

== Description ==
Plants in the genus Gompholobium mostly have leaves composed of three separate leaflets but some species have simple leaves and others have pinnate leaves. The leaflets are arranged alternately along the stems and are usually narrow and have smooth edges. The flowers are usually arranged in groups on the ends of the branches, sometimes singly or in pairs. The sepals form a short tube with five lobes longer than the tube. The large "standard" petal at the back of the flower is circular to kidney-shaped and is larger than the other petals. There are ten free stamens and the ovary is glabrous. The fruit is an oblong to almost spherical legume containing two to many ovules.

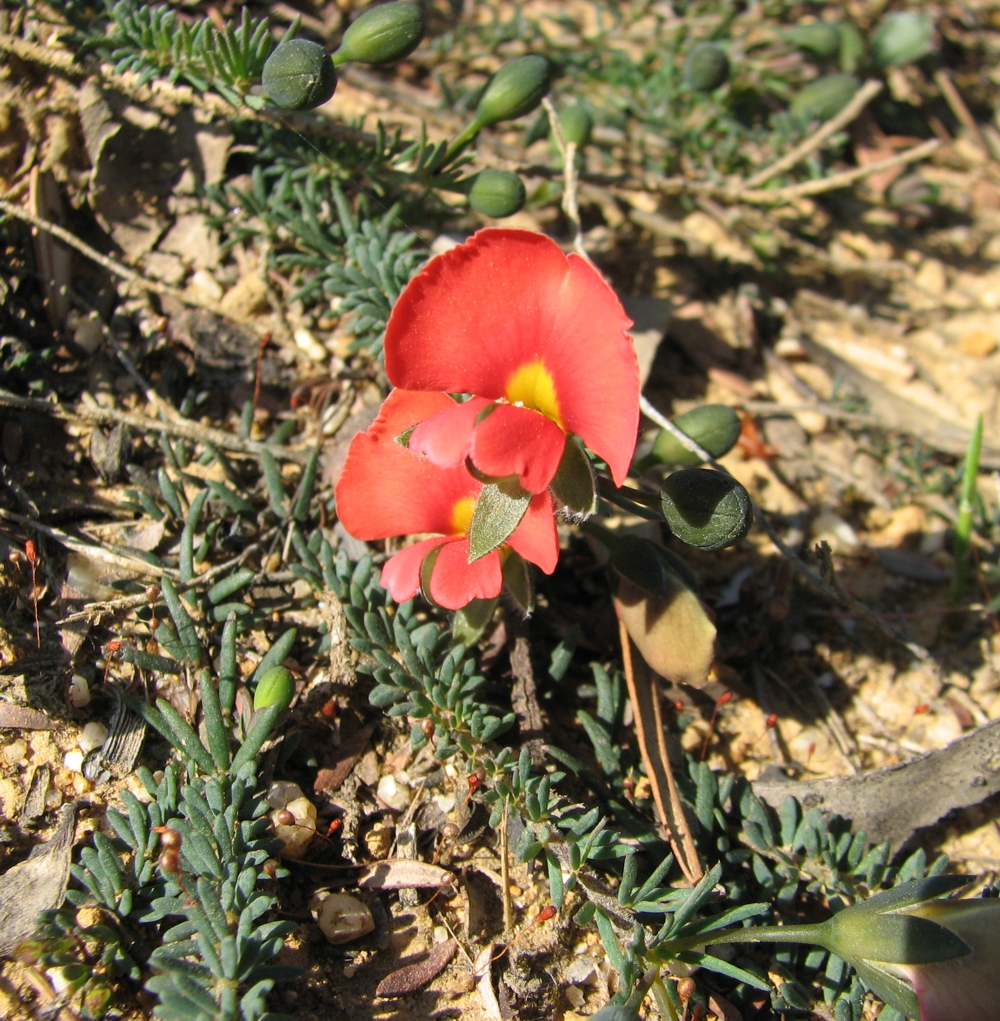
G. ecostatum growing in Anglesea Heath

== Taxonomy and naming ==
The genus Gompholobium was first formally described in 1798 by James Edward Smith and the description was published in Transactions of the Linnean Society of London. In 2008, Gompholobium grandiflorum was designated the lectotype. The genus name is derived from the Ancient Greek words gomphos, meaning "bolt", "peg", or "nail" and lobos meaning a "capsule" or "pod" referring to "the inflated shape of the seed pods".

== Distribution ==
Glory peas are found in all states of Australia.

== Species ==
The following is a list of species accepted by the Australian Plant Census as at December 2024:

- Gompholobium aristatum Benth. (W.A.)
- Gompholobium aspalathoides A.Cunn. ex Benth. (N.S.W., Qld.)
- Gompholobium baxteri Benth. (W.A.)
- Gompholobium burtonioides Meisn. (W.A.)
- Gompholobium capitatum A.Cunn. (W.A.)
- Gompholobium cinereum Chappill (W.A.)
- Gompholobium confertum (DC.) Crisp (W.A.)
- Gompholobium cyaninum Chappill (W.A.)
- Gompholobium ecostatum Kuchel — dwarf wedge-pea (Vic., S.A., Tas.)
- Gompholobium foliolosum Benth. (Qld., N.S.W.)
- Gompholobium gairdnerianum Chappill (W.A.)
- Gompholobium glabratum DC. – dainty wedge-pea (W.A.)
- Gompholobium glabristylum C.F.Wilkins & Sandiford (W.A.)
- Gompholobium glutinosum Chappill (W.A.)
- Gompholobium gompholobioides (F.Muell.) Crisp (W.A.)
- Gompholobium grandiflorum Sm. (N.S.W.)
- Gompholobium hendersonii Paxton (W.A.)
- Gompholobium huegelii Benth. – common wedge-pea (Qld., N.S.W., Vic., Tas.)
- Gompholobium inconspicuum Crisp – creeping wedge-pea (N.S.W., Vic.)
- Gompholobium karijini Chappill (W.A.)
- Gompholobium knightianum Lindl. (W.A.)
- Gompholobium latifolium Sm. – giant wedge-pea (N.S.W.)
- Gompholobium laxum (Benth.) Chappill (W.A.)
- Gompholobium marginatum R.Br. (W.A.)
- Gompholobium minus Sm. – dwarf wedge-pea (N.S.W.)
- Gompholobium muticum (Benth.) Chappill (W.A.)
- Gompholobium nitidum Sol. ex Benth. (Qld.)
- Gompholobium obcordatum Turcz. (W.A.)
- Gompholobium oreophilum C.F.Wilkins & Trudgen (W.A.)
- Gompholobium ovatum Meisn. (W.A.)
- Gompholobium pinnatum Sm. – pinnate wedge-pea (Qld., N.S.W.)
- Gompholobium polymorphum R.Br. (W.A.)
- Gompholobium polyzygum F.Muell. (W.A., N.T.)
- Gompholobium preissii Meisn. (W.A.)
- Gompholobium pungens Chappill (W.A.)
- Gompholobium roseum Chappill (W.A.)
- Gompholobium scabrum Sm. (W.A.)
- Gompholobium shuttleworthii Meisn. (W.A.)
- Gompholobium simplicifolium (F.Muell. & Tate) Crisp (W.A., N.T.)
- Gompholobium sp. Dave's Creek (P.I.Forster+ PIF15979) Qld Herbarium (Qld.)
- Gompholobium sp. Point Archer (J.Wrigley+ NQ1301) Qld Herbarium (Qld.)
- Gompholobium subulatum Benth. (W.A., N.T.)
- Gompholobium tomentosum Labill. – hairy yellow pea (W.A.)
- Gompholobium uncinatum A.Cunn. ex Benth. (Qld., N.S.W.)
- Gompholobium venustum R.Br. – handsome wedge-pea (W.A.)
- Gompholobium villosum (Meisn.) Crisp (W.A.)
- Gompholobium virgatum Sieber ex DC. – leafy wedge pea (N.S.W., Qld.)
- Gompholobium viscidulum Meisn.
- Gompholobium wonganense Chappill

== Ecology ==
Toxicity of plants of the genus was suspected and proven to be fatal to sheep, goats and other livestock introduced by the pastoralists at the Swan River Colony. This was reported by James Drummond in Hooker's London journal of botany 1842.
