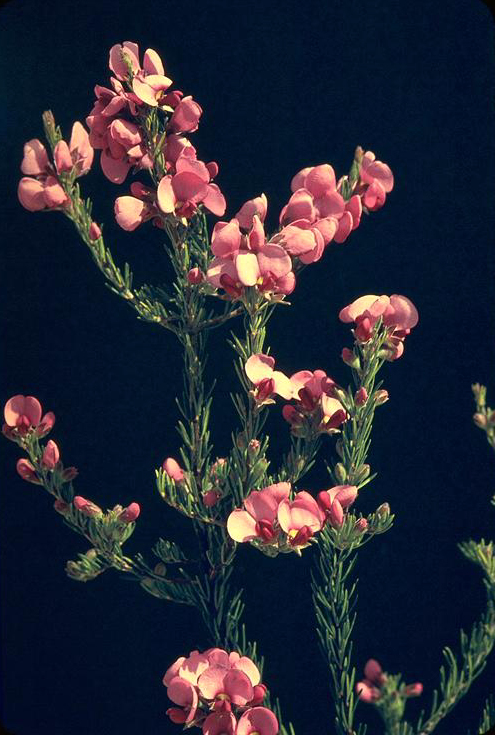

Scientific classification
- Kingdom: Plantae
- Clade: Tracheophytes
- Clade: Angiosperms
- Clade: Eudicots
- Clade: Rosids
- Order: Fabales
- Family: Fabaceae
- Subfamily: Faboideae
- Genus: Gompholobium
- Species: G. villosum

Binomial name
- Gompholobium villosum (Meisn.) Crisp

Synonyms
- Burtonia villosa Meisn.

= Gompholobium villosum =

Species of legume

Gompholobium villosum is a species of flowering plant in the pea family Fabaceae and is endemic to the south-west of Western Australia. It is a slender, erect shrub with simple, needle-shaped leaves with one or two grooves on the lower surface, and violet, pink or purple flowers.

== Description ==
Gompholobium villosum is a slender, erect shrub that typically grows to a height of 0.45–2.0 cm (0.18–0.79 in) and has hairy stems. The leaves are arranged alternately, needle-shaped but with one or two grooves on the lower surface, 10–12 mm (0.39–0.47 in) long and 0.7–1.2 mm (0.028–0.047 in) wide. The flowers are violet, pink or purple, each flower on a pedicel 6–7 mm (0.24–0.28 in) long with bracteoles attached. The sepals are 8–9 mm (0.31–0.35 in) long and hairy, the standard petal 15–16 mm (0.59–0.63 in) long, the wings 13.0–14.5 mm (0.51–0.57 in) long and the keel 12.0–13.5 mm (0.47–0.53 in) long. Flowering occurs from September to December and the fruit is a cylindrical pod.

== Taxonomy ==
This species of pea was first formally described in 1844 by Carl Meissner, who gave it the name Burtonia villosa in Lehmann's Plantae Preissianae. In 1987 Michael Crisp changed the name to Gompholobium villosum. The specific epithet (villosum) means "with long, soft hairs".

== Distribution and habitat ==
This species of pea grows in swampy areas and on hillsides in the Esperance Plains, Jarrah Forest, Swan Coastal Plain and Warren biogeographic regions of south-western Western Australia.

== Conservation status ==
Gompholobium villosum is classified as "not threatened" by the Government of Western Australia Department of Biodiversity, Conservation and Attractions.
