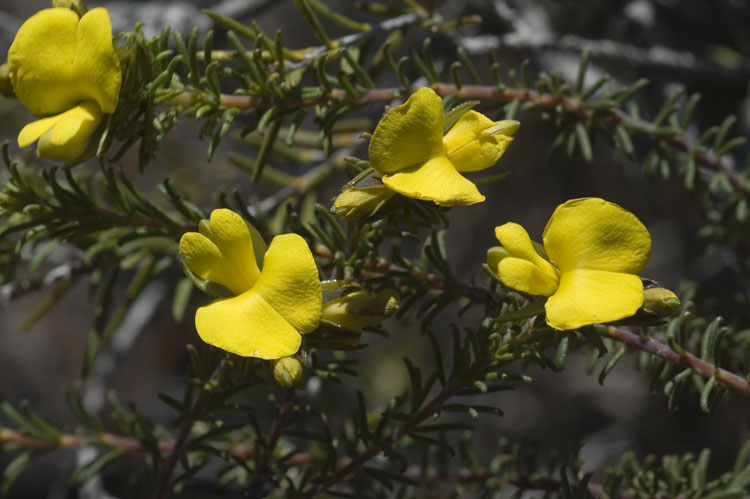
- At Lucky Bay

Scientific classification
- Kingdom: Plantae
- Clade: Tracheophytes
- Clade: Angiosperms
- Clade: Eudicots
- Clade: Rosids
- Order: Fabales
- Family: Fabaceae
- Subfamily: Faboideae
- Genus: Gompholobium
- Species: G. baxteri

Binomial name
- Gompholobium baxteri Benth.

= Gompholobium baxteri =

Species of flowering plant

Gompholobium baxteri is a species of flowering plant in the family Fabaceae and is endemic to the south-west of Western Australia. It an erect shrub that typically grows to a height of 15–75 cm (5.9–29.5 in) and flowers between August and December producing yellow, pea-like flowers. This species was first formally described in 1837 by George Bentham in Flora Australiensis from specimens collected in near King George Sound by William Baxter. The specific epithet (baxteri) honours the collector of the type specimens.

Gompholobium baxteri grows on flats and gentle slopes in the Coolgardie, Esperance Plains and Mallee biogeographic regions of south-western Western Australia.
