= Gompholobium roseum =

Conservation status
- Priority Two — Poorly Known Taxa (DEC)

Scientific classification
- Kingdom: Plantae
- Clade: Tracheophytes
- Clade: Angiosperms
- Clade: Eudicots
- Clade: Rosids
- Order: Fabales
- Family: Fabaceae
- Subfamily: Faboideae
- Genus: Gompholobium
- Species: G. roseum

Binomial name
- Gompholobium roseum Chappill

Species of flowering plant

Gompholobium roseum is a species of flowering plant in the family Fabaceae and is endemic to the south-west of Western Australia. It is an erect shrub with pinnate leaves and yellow, pink or green, pea-like flowers with pink or green markings.

== Description ==
Gompholobium roseum is an erect shrub with hairy, pinnate leaves 5–7 mm (0.20–0.28 in) long. The flowers are borne on hairy pedicels 10–15 mm (0.39–0.59 in) long with hairy bracteoles 1.5–1.7 mm (0.059–0.067 in) long. The sepals are 8.5–9 mm (0.33–0.35 in) long, the standard petal is yellow, pink or green with yellow, pink or green markings and 11.5–12.0 mm (0.45–0.47 in) long, the wings 9.5–10 mm (0.37–0.39 in) long, and the keel 10–11 mm (0.39–0.43 in) long. Flowering occurs in October and the fruit is a cylindrical pod.

== Taxonomy ==
Gompholobium roseum was first formally described in 2008 by Jennifer Anne Chappill in Australian Systematic Botany from specimens collected by Robert Royce near Watheroo National Park in 1971. The specific epithet (roseum) means "rosy", referring to the flowers.

== Distribution ==
This pea is found in the Avon Wheatbelt, Geraldton Sandplains and Swan Coastal Plain biogeographic regions of south-western Western Australia.

== Conservation status ==
Gompholobium roseum is classified as "Priority Two" by the Western Australian Government Department of Parks and Wildlife meaning that it is poorly known and from only one or a few locations.
