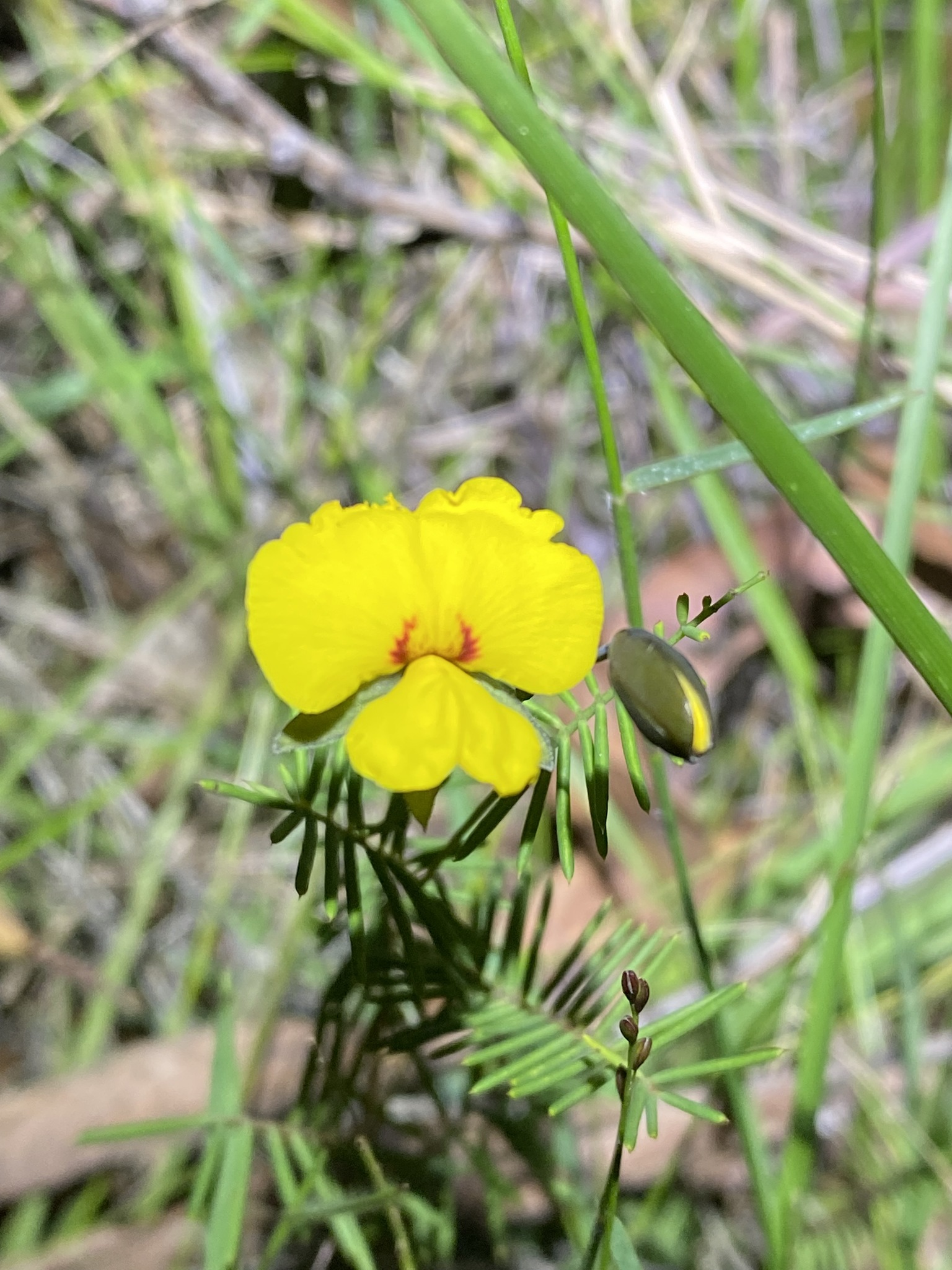
- Gompholobium pinnatum

Scientific classification
- Kingdom: Plantae
- Clade: Tracheophytes
- Clade: Angiosperms
- Clade: Eudicots
- Clade: Rosids
- Order: Fabales
- Family: Fabaceae
- Subfamily: Faboideae
- Genus: Gompholobium
- Species: G. pinnatum

Binomial name
- Gompholobium pinnatum Sm.

= Gompholobium pinnatum =

Pinnate wedge-pea

Species of legume

Gompholobium pinnatum, commonly known as pinnate wedge-pea, is a species of flowering plant in the pea family Fabaceae and is endemic to eastern Australia. It is an ascending or erect shrub with pinnate leaves and yellow flowers with red marks.

== Description ==
Gompholobium pinnatum is an ascending to erect, often sprawling shrub that typically grows to a height of 10–40 cm (3.9–15.7 in) and has thin, more or less glabrous stems. The leaves are pinnate with 15 to 31 narrow linear to narrow elliptic leaflets, 6–12 mm (0.24–0.47 in) long and 0.5–1.5 mm (0.020–0.059 in) wide with a minute point on the tip and the edges curved down or rolled under. The flowers are arranged in small groups on the ends of branchlets, each flower on a pedicel 5–10 mm (0.20–0.39 in) long. The sepals are 5–6 mm (0.20–0.24 in) long, the standard petal yellow with red marks and 6–10 mm (0.24–0.39 in) long, wings yellow and the keel green. Flowering occurs in spring and summer and the fruit is an oval or spherical pod 6–10 mm (0.24–0.39 in) long.

== Taxonomy ==
Gompholobium pinnatum was first formally described in 1805 by James Edward Smith in Annals of Botany. The specific epithet (pinnatum) refers to the pinnate leaves.

== Distribution and habitat ==
Pinnate wedge-pea grows in forest, woodland, heathland and shrubland, often in wet places and is widespread on the coast and nearby ranges of Queensland and New South Wales as far south as Jervis Bay.
