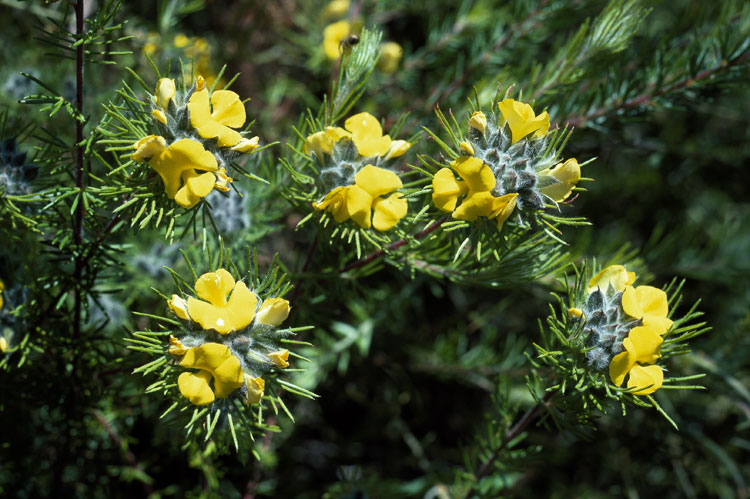
- Near Bunbury

Scientific classification
- Kingdom: Plantae
- Clade: Tracheophytes
- Clade: Angiosperms
- Clade: Eudicots
- Clade: Rosids
- Order: Fabales
- Family: Fabaceae
- Subfamily: Faboideae
- Genus: Gompholobium
- Species: G. capitatum

Binomial name
- Gompholobium capitatum A.Cunn.

= Gompholobium capitatum =

Yellow pea

Species of flowering plant

Gompholobium capitatum, commonly known as yellow pea, is a species of flowering plant in the family Fabaceae and is endemic to the south-west of Western Australia. It a slender, erect or ascending shrub with pinnate leaves and yellow flowers.

== Description ==
Gompholobium capitatum is a slender, erect or spreading shrub that typically grows to a height of 0.2–1 m (7.9 in – 3 ft 3.4 in). It has pinnate leaves with five to seven cylindrical leaflets, each 7–22 mm (0.28–0.87 in) long and 0.7–1.7 mm (0.028–0.067 in) wide with a stipule 2–3 mm (0.079–0.118 in) long at the base of the leaf. Each flowers is borne on a hairy pedicel 3–5 mm (0.12–0.20 in) long with hairy sepals 9–13 mm (0.35–0.51 in) long. The flowers are uniformly yellow, the standard petal 13–14 mm (0.51–0.55 in) long, the wings 9–13 mm (0.35–0.51 in) long and the keel 10.2–11.5 mm (0.40–0.45 in) long. Flowering occurs from September to December and the fruit is a flattened pod.

== Taxonomy ==
Gompholobium capitatum was first formally described in 1832 by Allan Cunningham in Edwards's Botanical Register from specimens raised by Joseph Knight in London from seed collected by William Baxter near King George Sound. The specific epithet (capitatum) means "capitate", referring to the flowers.

== Distribution and habitat ==
Yellow pea grows in sandy soil in heath and forest in the Esperance Plains, Jarrah Forest, Swan Coastal Plain and Warren biogeographic regions of south-western Western Australia.

== Conservation status ==
This pea is classified as "not threatened" by the Western Australian Government Department of Parks and Wildlife.
