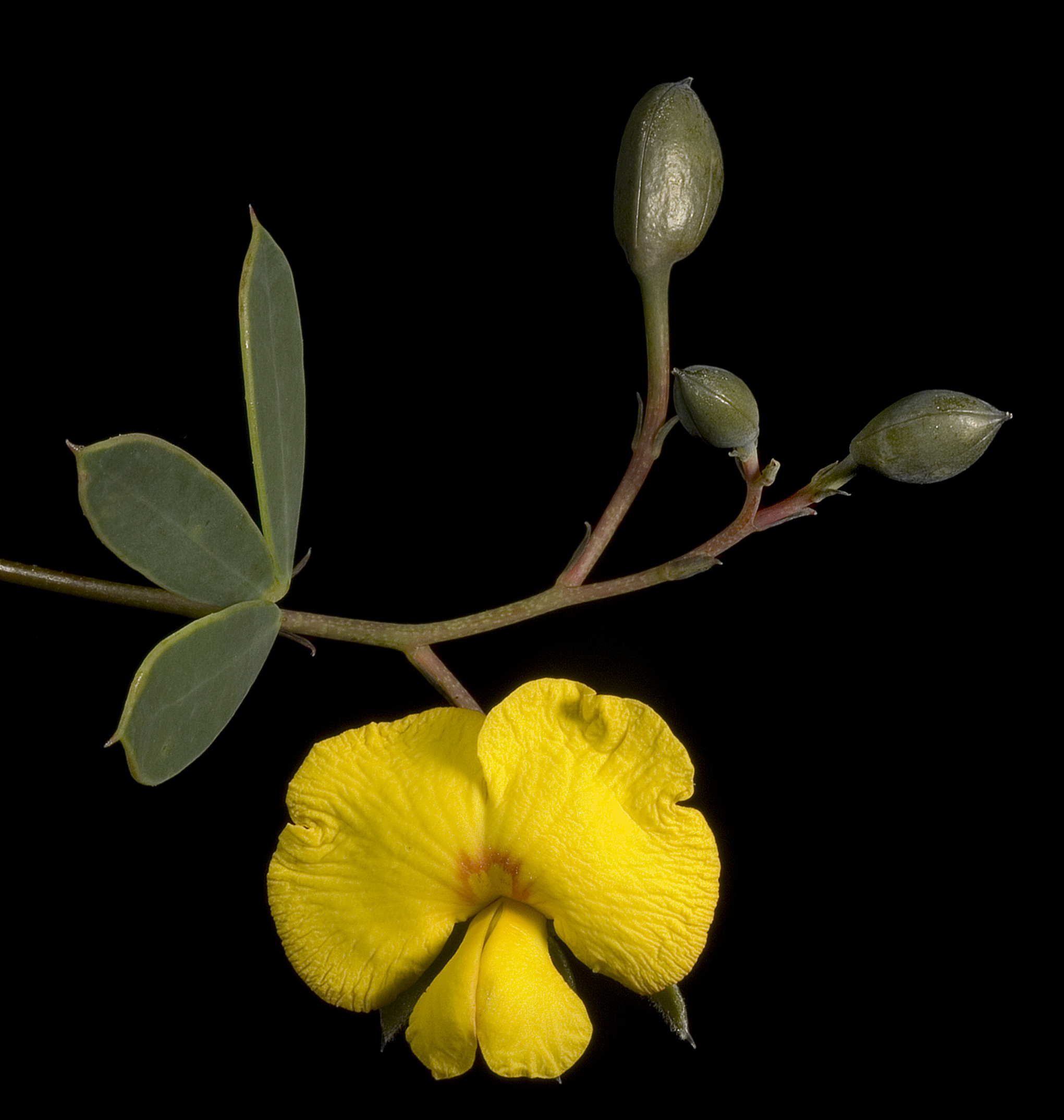

Scientific classification
- Kingdom: Plantae
- Clade: Embryophytes
- Clade: Tracheophytes
- Clade: Spermatophytes
- Clade: Angiosperms
- Clade: Eudicots
- Clade: Rosids
- Order: Fabales
- Family: Fabaceae
- Subfamily: Faboideae
- Genus: Gompholobium
- Species: G. marginatum

Binomial name
- Gompholobium marginatum R.Br.

= Gompholobium marginatum =

Species of flowering plant

Gompholobium marginatum is a species of flowering plant in the family Fabaceae and is endemic to the south-west of Western Australia. It is a prostrate or low, spreading shrub with palmate leaves and uniformly yellow, pea-like flowers.

== Description ==
Gompholobium marginatum is a prostrate or low, spreading shrub that typically grows to a height of 5–40 cm (2.0–15.7 in) with spiny stems. Its leaves are palmate, 10–25 mm (0.39–0.98 in) long and sessile. The flowers are uniformly yellow, borne on glabrous pedicels 10–12.7 mm (0.39–0.50 in) long with bracteoles attached. The sepals are glabrous, 5.5–8 mm (0.22–0.31 in) long, the standard petal 8–10 mm (0.31–0.39 in) long, the wings 6.5–8 mm (0.26–0.31 in) long and the keel 6–7 mm (0.24–0.28 in) long. Flowering occurs from August to November and the fruit is a pod about 10 mm (0.39 in) long.

== Taxonomy ==
Gompholobium marginatum was first formally described in 1811 by Robert Brown in Hortus Kewensis. The specific epithet (marginatum) means "furnished with a border", referring to the thickened edge of the leaves.

== Distribution and habitat ==
Gompholobium marginatum grows in gravelly or granitic soils in the Avon Wheatbelt, Esperance Plains, Geraldton Sandplains, Jarrah Forest, Mallee, Swan Coastal Plain and Warren biogeographic regions of south-western Western Australia.

== Conservation status ==
Gompholobium marginatum is classified as "not threatened" by the Western Australian Government Department of Parks and Wildlife.
