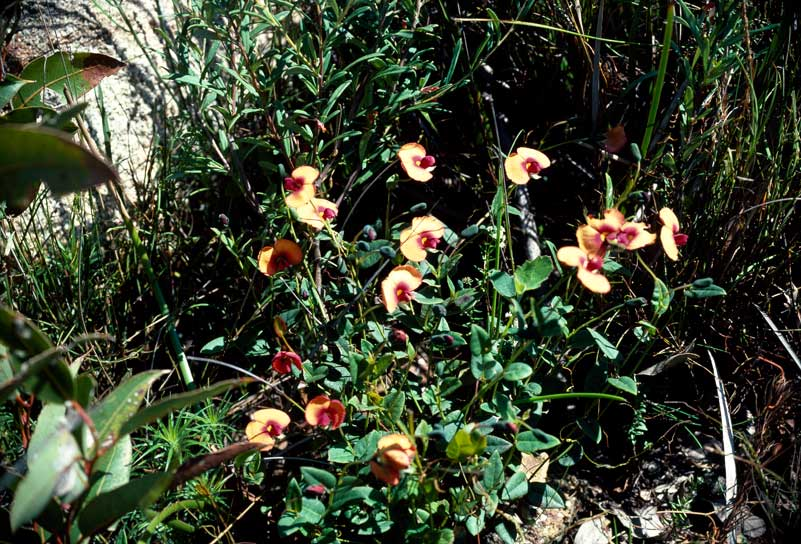

Scientific classification
- Kingdom: Plantae
- Clade: Tracheophytes
- Clade: Angiosperms
- Clade: Eudicots
- Clade: Rosids
- Order: Fabales
- Family: Fabaceae
- Subfamily: Faboideae
- Genus: Gompholobium
- Species: G. ovatum

Binomial name
- Gompholobium ovatum Meisn.

Synonyms
- Gompholobium amplexicaule Meisn.

= Gompholobium ovatum =

Species of flowering plant

Gompholobium ovatum is a species of flowering plant in the family Fabaceae and is endemic to the south-west of Western Australia. It is an erect or prostrate shrub with egg-shaped leaves and yellow and red to purple, pea-like flowers.

== Description ==
Gompholobium ovatum is an erect or prostrate shrub that typically grows to a height of 10–50 cm (3.9–19.7 in). Its leaves are egg-shaped, 20–45 mm (0.79–1.77 in) long and 8–32 mm (0.31–1.26 in) wide with stipules about 3 mm (0.12 in) long at the base. The flowers are mostly yellow or orange-red with brown, pink or purple markings, and are borne on pedicels 22–40 mm (0.87–1.57 in) long with bracteoles about 5 mm (0.20 in) long attached. The sepals are 10–13 mm (0.39–0.51 in) long, the standard petal 15–17 mm (0.59–0.67 in) long, the wings 10–15 mm (0.39–0.59 in) long and the keel 9–12 mm (0.35–0.47 in) long. Flowering occurs from August to December and the fruit is a pod 10.5–11 mm (0.41–0.43 in) long.

== Taxonomy ==
Gompholobium ovatum was first formally described in 1844 by Carl Meissner in Lehmann's Plantae Preissianae. The specific epithet (ovatum) means "egg-shaped", referring to the leaves.

== Distribution and habitat ==
This species of gompholobium grows on flats and rocky slopes in the Esperance Plains, Jarrah Forest, Swan Coastal Plain and Warren biogeographic regions of south-western Western Australia.

== Conservation status ==
Gompholobium ovatum is classified as "not threatened" by the Western Australian Government Department of Parks and Wildlife.
