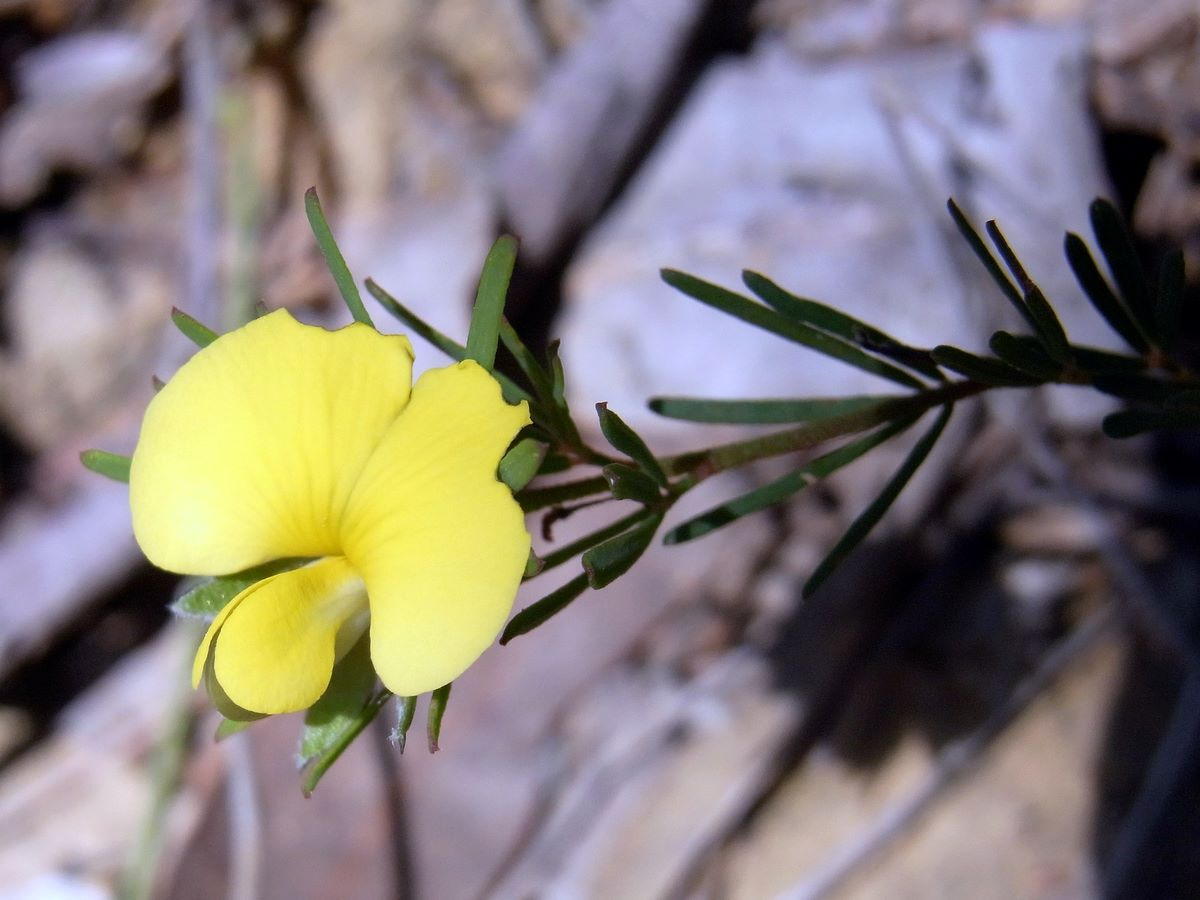
- Gompholobium glabratum at Ku-ring-gai Chase National Park, Australia

Scientific classification
- Kingdom: Plantae
- Clade: Tracheophytes
- Clade: Angiosperms
- Clade: Eudicots
- Clade: Rosids
- Order: Fabales
- Family: Fabaceae
- Subfamily: Faboideae
- Genus: Gompholobium
- Species: G. glabratum

Binomial name
- Gompholobium glabratum DC.

Synonyms
- Gompholobium polymorphum Benth. nom. inval., pro syn.

= Gompholobium glabratum =

Dainty wedge-pea

Species of legume

Gompholobium glabratum, commonly known as dainty wedge-pea, is a species of flowering plant in the family Fabaceae and is endemic to south-eastern continental Australia. It is a low-lying or ascending shrub with pinnate leaves that have five to seven leaflets, and yellow and green or greyish flowers.

== Description ==
Gompholobium glabratum is a low-lying or ascending shrub that typically grows up to a height of 5–40 cm (2.0–15.7 in) and has pimply stems. The leaves are pinnate with five to seven leaflets that are linear to narrow lance-shaped, 10–15 mm (0.39–0.59 in) long and 0.5–1.5 mm (0.020–0.059 in) wide and more or less glabrous, the edges curved down or rolled under. The flowers are arranged in small groups on the ends of branchlets, each flower on a pedicel 4–10 mm (0.16–0.39 in) long with sepals up to about 8 mm (0.31 in) long. The petals are 8–10 mm (0.31–0.39 in) long, the standard petal and wings yellow or greenish-yellow and the keel dark brown to greyish. Flowering occurs from August to October and the fruit is an oval pod 8–10 mm (0.31–0.39 in) long.

== Taxonomy and naming ==
Gompholobium glabratum was first formally described in 1825 by Augustin Pyramus de Candolle in his Prodromus Systematis Naturalis Regni Vegetabilis. The specific epithet (glabratum) means "nearly glabrous".

== Distribution and habitat ==
Dainty wedge-pea grows forest and heath on the coast and tablelands of New South Wales south from Forster to the far north-eastern corner of Victoria.
