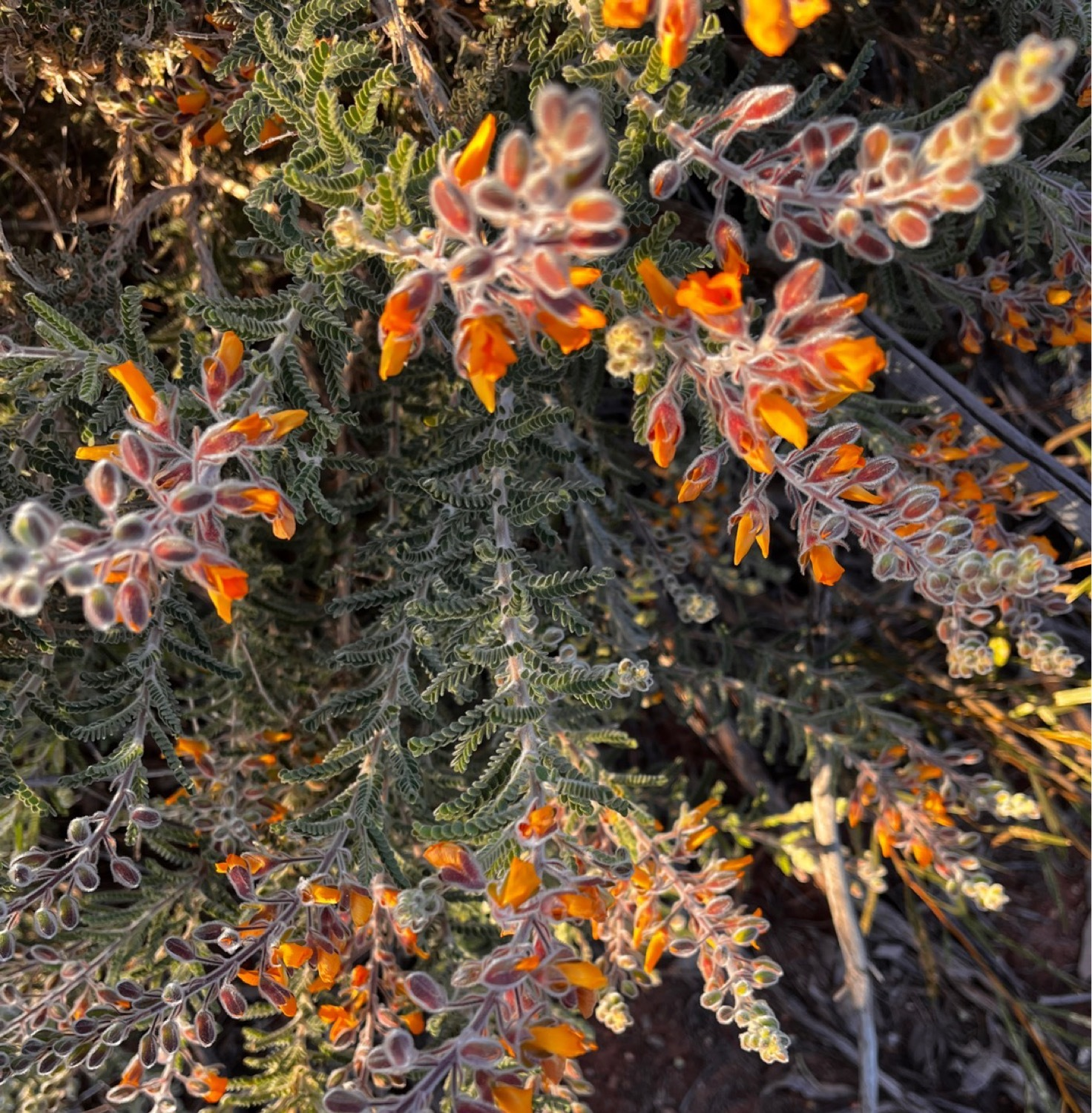

Scientific classification
- Kingdom: Plantae
- Clade: Tracheophytes
- Clade: Angiosperms
- Clade: Eudicots
- Clade: Rosids
- Order: Fabales
- Family: Fabaceae
- Subfamily: Faboideae
- Genus: Gompholobium
- Species: G. polyzygum

Binomial name
- Gompholobium polyzygum F.Muell.

= Gompholobium polyzygum =

Species of flowering plant

Gompholobium polyzygum is a species of flowering plant in the family Fabaceae and is endemic to north-western Australia. It is an erect or prostrate shrub with pinnate leaves each with sixteen to twenty-one pairs of leaflets, and yellow-orange and greenish, pea-like flowers.

== Description ==
Gompholobium polyzygum is an erect or prostrate shrub that typically grows to a height of 0.3–1.5 m (1 ft 0 in – 4 ft 11 in) with its branchlets densely covered with spreading or curly hairs. Its leaves are pinnate with sixteen to twenty-one pairs of elliptic to more or less round or egg-shaped leaves with the narrower end towards the base, 2–3.5 mm (0.079–0.138 in) long and 1.6–3.3 mm (0.063–0.130 in) wide. The leaves are on a petiole 1.3–3 mm (0.051–0.118 in) long, the leaflets on petiolules 0.3–0.4 mm (0.012–0.016 in) long. The flowers are borne in racemes of between five and sixteen on a peduncle 6–14 mm (0.24–0.55 in) long, each flower on a pedicel 4–10 mm (0.16–0.39 in) long. There are bracts 3.5–10 mm (0.14–0.39 in) long at the base of the flowers and hairy bracteoles 3.1–9.5 mm (0.12–0.37 in) long on the upper part of the pedicels. The sepals are fused at the base forming a tube, the upper lobes 5.1–7.0 mm (0.20–0.28 in) long and the lower lobes 5.3–6.5 mm (0.21–0.26 in) long. The standard petal is yellow-orange and 9.5–11.8 mm (0.37–0.46 in) long, the wings 10–12 mm (0.39–0.47 in) long and the keel orange or yellowish green and 10–12 mm (0.39–0.47 in) long. Flowering occurs from July to October and the fruit is a pod 5.5–7.0 mm (0.22–0.28 in) long.

== Taxonomy ==
Gompholobium polyzygum was first formally described in 1862 by Ferdinand von Mueller in Fragmenta phytographiae Australiae. The specific epithet (polyzygum) means "many-yolked", referring to the many leaflets of each leaf.

== Distribution and habitat ==
This gompholobium grows open shrubland and grassland in arid inland areas of the Northern Territory and Western Australia.

== Conservation status ==
Gompholobium polyzygum is classified as "not threatened" by the Western Australian Government Department of Parks and Wildlife and as of "least concern" under the Territory Parks and Wildlife Conservation Act 1976.
