= Gompholobium laxum =

Scientific classification
- Kingdom: Plantae
- Clade: Tracheophytes
- Clade: Angiosperms
- Clade: Eudicots
- Clade: Rosids
- Order: Fabales
- Family: Fabaceae
- Subfamily: Faboideae
- Genus: Gompholobium
- Species: G. laxum

Binomial name
- Gompholobium laxum (Benth.) Chappill

Species of flowering plant

Gompholobium laxum is a species of flowering plant in the family Fabaceae and is endemic to the south-west of Western Australia. It is an erect, open shrub with needle-shaped leaves and uniformly yellow, pea-like flowers.

== Description ==
Gompholobium laxum is an erect, open shrub that typically grows to a height of up to 40 cm (16 in). Its leaves are needle-shaped, 5–12 mm (0.20–0.47 in) long and 0.4–0.5 mm (0.016–0.020 in) long but with one or two longitudinal grooves on the lower surface. The flowers are uniformly yellow, borne on pedicels 3–9 mm (0.12–0.35 in) long with bracteoles 1.5–1.8 mm (0.059–0.071 in) long. The sepals are hairy, about 9.5 mm (0.37 in) long, the standard petal 10.0–10.5 mm (0.39–0.41 in) long, wings 9.0–9.5 mm (0.35–0.37 in) long and the keel 10.5–11.6 mm (0.41–0.46 in) long. Flowering occurs from September to November and the fruit is a pod about 7.5 mm (0.30 in) long.

== Taxonomy ==
This species was first formally described in 1864 by George Bentham, who gave it the name Gompholobium aristatum var. laxum in Flora Australiensis. In 2008, Jennifer Anne Chappill raised the variety to species status as Gompholobium laxum in Australian Systematic Botany. The specific epithet (laxum) means "open", referring to the long pedicels.

== Distribution and habitat ==
Gompholobium laxum grows in woodland in the Avon Wheatbelt, Esperance Plains, Jarrah Forest and Mallee biogeographic regions of south-western Western Australia.

== Conservation status ==
Gompholobium laxum is classified as "not threatened" by the Western Australian Government Department of Parks and Wildlife.
