= Gompholobium hendersonii =

Scientific classification
- Kingdom: Plantae
- Clade: Embryophytes
- Clade: Tracheophytes
- Clade: Spermatophytes
- Clade: Angiosperms
- Clade: Eudicots
- Clade: Rosids
- Order: Fabales
- Family: Fabaceae
- Subfamily: Faboideae
- Genus: Gompholobium
- Species: G. hendersonii

Binomial name
- Gompholobium hendersonii Paxton

Species of flowering plant

Gompholobium hendersonii is a species of flowering plant in the family Fabaceae and is endemic to the south-west of Western Australia. It is an erect shrub with simple leaves, and red and purplish-brown, pea-like flowers.

== Description ==
Gompholobium hendersonii is an erect shrub that typically grows to a height of 30–90 cm (12–35 in). Its leaves are simple, 4.0–5.2 mm (0.16–0.20 in) long, 0.6–1 mm (0.024–0.039 in) wide and lacks stipules. The flowers are red and purplish-brown, borne on glabrous pedicels 3–5 mm (0.12–0.20 in) long with glabrous sepals 8.2–10 mm (0.32–0.39 in) long. The standard petal is 13–15 mm (0.51–0.59 in) long, the wings 10.5–11 mm (0.41–0.43 in) long and the keel 11–15 mm (0.43–0.59 in) long. Flowering occurs from September to October and the fruit is a pod.

== Taxonomy ==
Gompholobium hendersonii was first formally described in 1842 by Joseph Paxton in Paxton's Magazine of Botany from specimens grown in the gardens of "Messrs. Henderson, of Pine-apple Place" from seed collected in 1840 from the Swan River, by "Captain Mangles". The specific epithet (hendersonii) honours the gardener, Joseph Henderson.

== Distribution and habitat ==
This pea grows on undulating plains in the Avon Wheatbelt, Coolgardie and Mallee biogeographic regions in the south-west of Western Australia.

== Conservation status ==
Gompholobium hendersonii is classified as "not threatened" by the Government of Western Australia Department of Parks and Wildlife.
