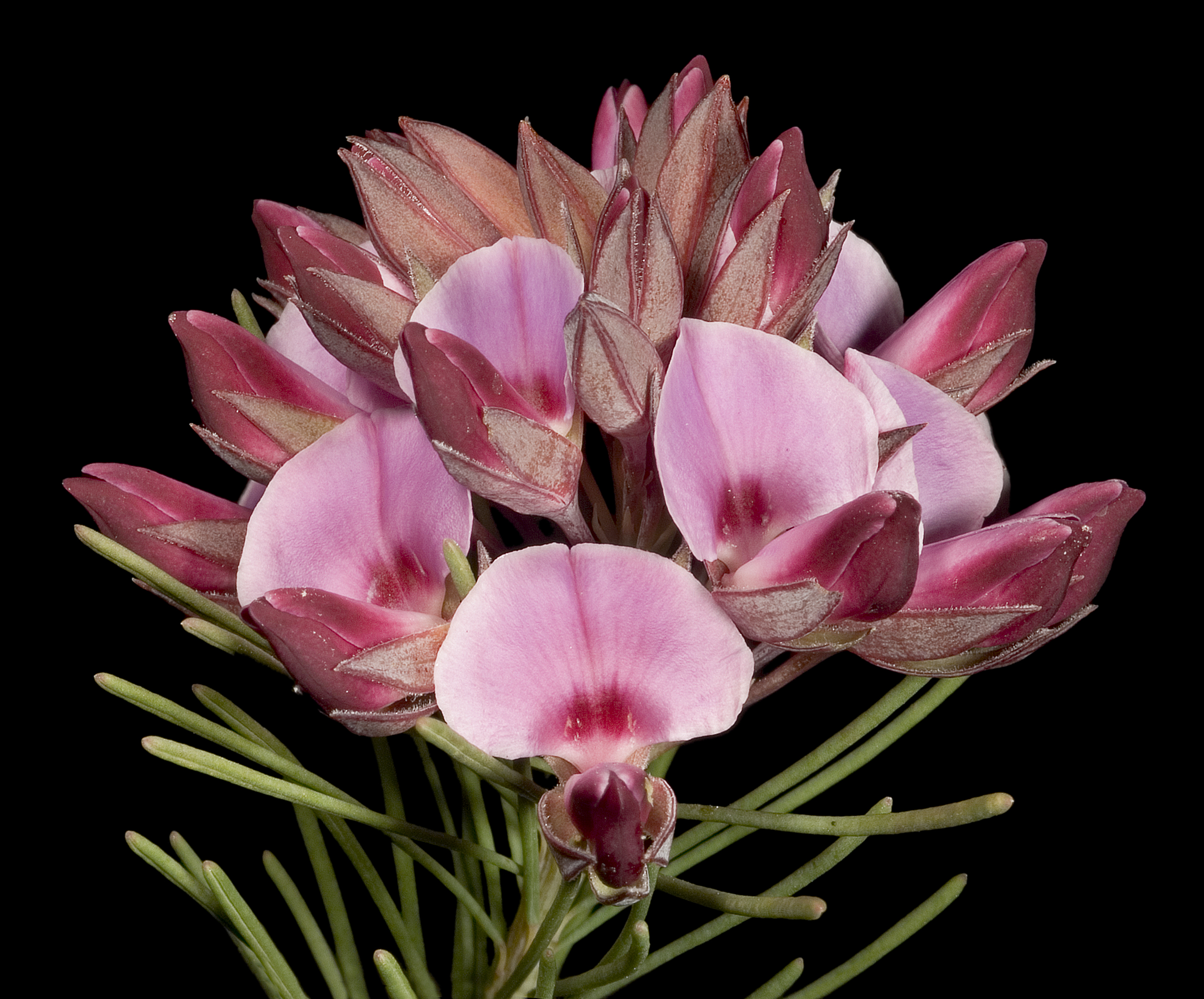

Scientific classification
- Kingdom: Plantae
- Clade: Tracheophytes
- Clade: Angiosperms
- Clade: Eudicots
- Clade: Rosids
- Order: Fabales
- Family: Fabaceae
- Subfamily: Faboideae
- Genus: Gompholobium
- Species: G. confertum

Binomial name
- Gompholobium confertum (DC.) Crisp

= Gompholobium confertum =

Species of flowering plant

Gompholobium confertum is a species of flowering plant in the family Fabaceae and is endemic to the south-west of Western Australia. It a shrub that typically grows to a height of .15–1.2 m (5.9 in – 3 ft 11.2 in) and flowers from August to December or January to March producing purple-blue, pea-like flowers. This species was first formally described in 1825 by Augustin Pyramus de Candolle who gave it the name Burtonia conferta in Prodromus Systematis Naturalis Regni Vegetabilis. In 1987 Michael Douglas Crisp changed the name to Gompholobium confertum. The specific epithet (confertum) means "crowded", referring to the foliage.

Gompholobium confertum grows in sandy soil on undulating plains and in winter-west areas in the Avon Wheatbelt, Esperance Plains, Geraldton Sandplains, Jarrah Forest, Mallee, Swan Coastal Plain and Warren biogeographic regions of south-western Western Australia. It is classified as "not threatened" by the Government of Western Australia Department of Parks and Wildlife.
