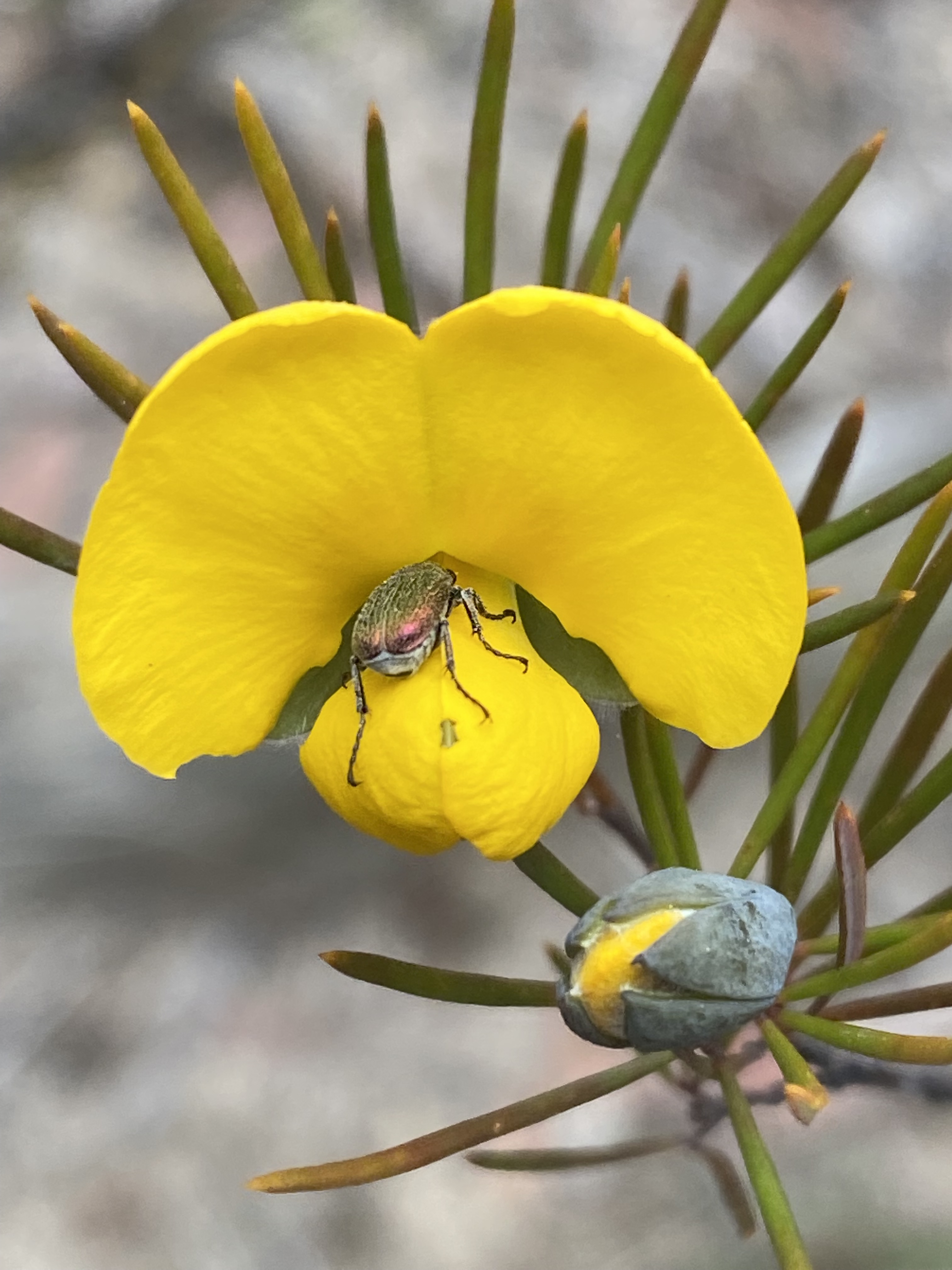

Scientific classification
- Kingdom: Plantae
- Clade: Tracheophytes
- Clade: Angiosperms
- Clade: Eudicots
- Clade: Rosids
- Order: Fabales
- Family: Fabaceae
- Subfamily: Faboideae
- Genus: Gompholobium
- Species: G. grandiflorum

Binomial name
- Gompholobium grandiflorum Sm.

Synonyms
- Gompholobium glaucescens A.Cunn.; Gompholobium glaucum Steud. nom. inval., pro syn.; Gompholobium grandiflorum Andrews nom. illeg.; Gompholobium grandiflorum Sm. var. grandiflorum; Gompholobium grandiflorum var. setifolium DC.; Gompholobium setifolium Benth. nom. inval., pro syn.; Gompholobium setifolium Sieber ex Steud. nom. inval., pro syn.

= Gompholobium grandiflorum =

Large wedge-pea

Species of legume

Gompholobium grandiflorum, commonly known as large wedge-pea, is a species of flowering plant in the family Fabaceae and is endemic to eastern New South Wales. It is an erect, more or less glabrous shrub with trifoliate leaves and lemon-yellow and greenish, pea-like flowers.

== Description ==
Gompholobium grandiflorum is an erect, more or less glabrous shrub that typically grows to a height of 1–2 m (3 ft 3 in – 6 ft 7 in) and has smooth, often warty stems. The leaves are trifoliate with linear leaflets 11–33 mm (0.43–1.30 in) long and about 0.5–1.6 mm (0.020–0.063 in) wide with a sharp point on the tip and the edges curved down or rolled under. The flowers are 15–25 mm (0.59–0.98 in) long and arranged singly or in small groups on the ends of branches, each flower on a pedicel up to 7 mm (0.28 in) long. The sepals are about 12 mm (0.47 in) long, the standard petal and wings are lemon-yellow and the keel is greenish. Flowering occurs in most months but mainly in spring and the fruit is an oval pod up to 15 mm (0.59 in) long.

== Taxonomy ==
Gompholobium grandiflorum was first formally described in 1804 by James Edward Smith in Exotic Botany. The specific epithet (grandiflorum) means "large-flowered" but the flowers are only large in comparison to those known to Smith at the time.

== Distribution and habitat ==
Large wedge-pea grows in forest and heath on sandstone soils on the coast and nearby tablelands of New South Wales between Gosford and Jervis Bay and inland to the Blue Mountains.
