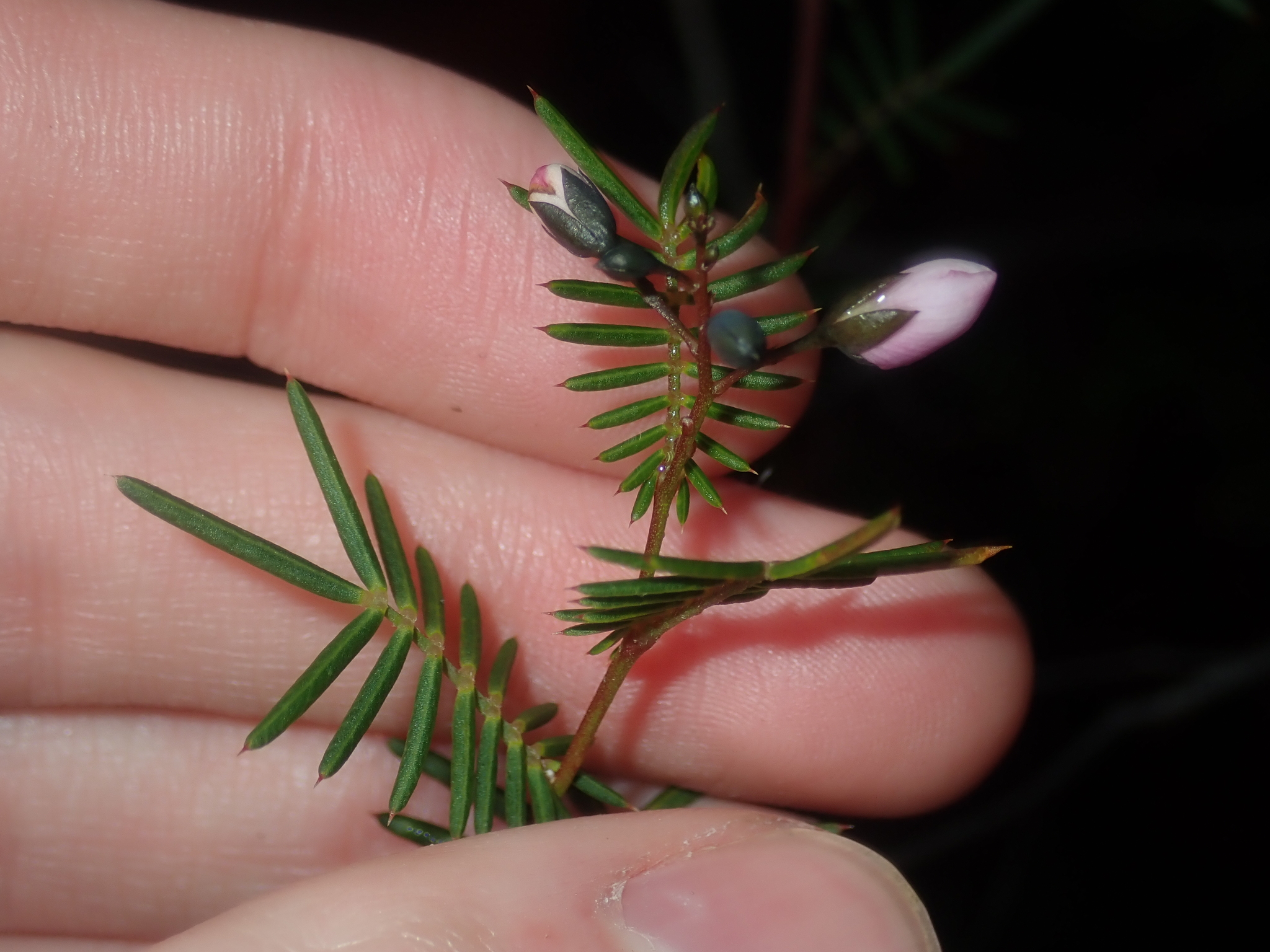

Scientific classification
- Kingdom: Plantae
- Clade: Tracheophytes
- Clade: Angiosperms
- Clade: Eudicots
- Clade: Rosids
- Order: Fabales
- Family: Fabaceae
- Subfamily: Faboideae
- Genus: Gompholobium
- Species: G. pungens

Binomial name
- Gompholobium pungens Chappill

= Gompholobium pungens =

Species of flowering plant

Gompholobium pungens is a species of flowering plant in the family Fabaceae and is endemic to the south-west of Western Australia. It is an erect, openly-branched shrub with spiny stems, pinnate leaves and mostly yellow, pea-like flowers with pink or purple markings.

== Description ==
Gompholobium pungens is an erect, openly-branched shrub that typically grows to 50–70 cm (20–28 in) high and up to 40 m (130 ft) wide and has spiny stems. Its leaves are 17–72 mm (0.67–2.83 in) long and pinnate with eight to seventeen cylindrical leaflets. Each flower is borne on a hairy pedicel 7.0–7.2 mm (0.28–0.28 in) long with hairy bracteoles 1.2–1.5 mm (0.047–0.059 in) long. The sepals are about 8 mm (0.31 in) long, the standard petal is yellow to orange with pink or purple markings and about 7.6 mm (0.30 in) long, the wings about 7 mm (0.28 in) long, and the keel about 6.5 mm (0.26 in) long. Flowering occurs from August to September and the fruit is a pod about 7 mm (0.28 in) long.

== Taxonomy ==
Gompholobium pungens was first formally described in 2008 by Jennifer Anne Chappill in Australian Systematic Botany from specimens collected near Warradarge in 1999. The specific epithet (pungens) means "ending in a sharp, hard point".

== Distribution and habitat ==
This pea grows in lower valley slopes and on small rises in the Geraldton Sandplains, Jarrah Forest and Swan Coastal Plain biogeographic regions of south-western Western Australia.

== Conservation status ==
Gompholobium pungens is classified as "not threatened" by the Western Australian Government Department of Parks and Wildlife.
