= Gompholobium glutinosum =

Scientific classification
- Kingdom: Plantae
- Clade: Tracheophytes
- Clade: Angiosperms
- Clade: Eudicots
- Clade: Rosids
- Order: Fabales
- Family: Fabaceae
- Subfamily: Faboideae
- Genus: Gompholobium
- Species: G. glutinosum

Binomial name
- Gompholobium glutinosum Chappill

Species of flowering plant

Gompholobium glutinosum is a species of flowering plant in the family Fabaceae and is endemic to the far west of Western Australia. It is an erect, openly-branched shrub with pinnate leaves with three to five leaflets, and yellow and red, pea-like flowers.

== Description ==
Gompholobium glutinosum is an erect, openly-branched shrub that typically grows to a height of 15–60 cm (5.9–23.6 in). Its leaves are pinnate with three or five leaflets that are 5.8–25 mm (0.23–0.98 in) long with stipules at the base. The flowers are yellow and red, borne on hairy pedicels 1–5 mm (0.039–0.197 in) long with hairy sepals 8–10 mm (0.31–0.39 in) long. The standard petal is 10–12 mm (0.39–0.47 in) long, the wings 9.5–10.5 mm (0.37–0.41 in) long and the keel 9–11 mm (0.35–0.43 in) long. Flowering occurs from September to October and the fruit is a pod.

== Taxonomy ==
Gompholobium glutinosum was first formally described in 2008 by Jennifer Anne Chappill in Australian Systematic Botany from specimens collected near Kalbarri in 1979. The specific epithet (glutinosum) means "sticky" or "glutinous", referring to the foliage of this species.

== Distribution and habitat ==
This pea grows on valleys, hills and plains in the Avon Wheatbelt and Geraldton Sandplains biogeographic regions in the far west of Western Australia.

== Conservation status ==
Gompholobium glutinosum is classified as "not threatened" by the Government of Western Australia Department of Parks and Wildlife.
