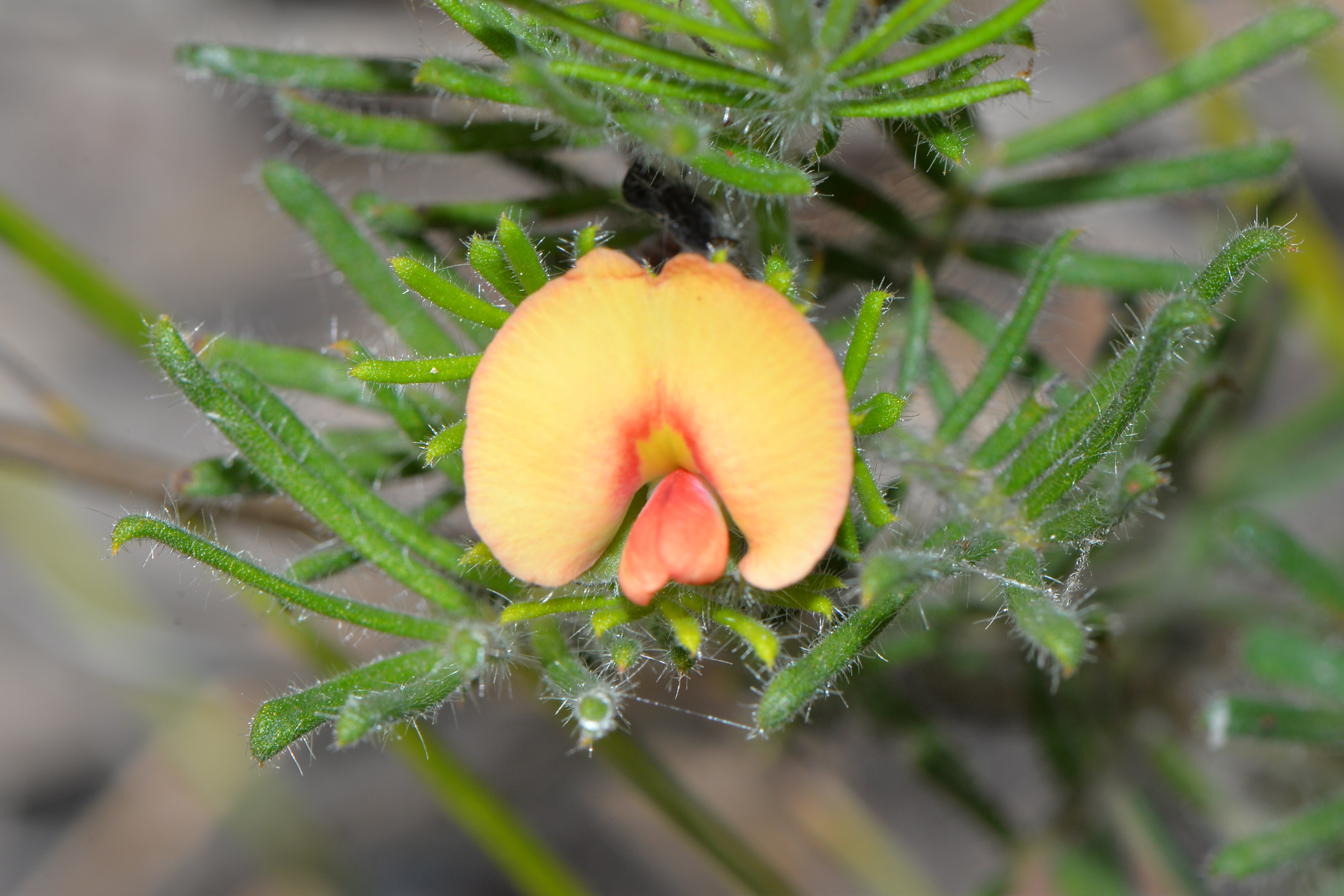
- Near Jurien Bay

Scientific classification
- Kingdom: Plantae
- Clade: Tracheophytes
- Clade: Angiosperms
- Clade: Eudicots
- Clade: Rosids
- Order: Fabales
- Family: Fabaceae
- Subfamily: Faboideae
- Genus: Gompholobium
- Species: G. preissii

Binomial name
- Gompholobium preissii Meisn.

Synonyms
- Gompholobium hirsutum Paxton

= Gompholobium preissii =

Species of flowering plant

Gompholobium preissii is a species of flowering plant in the family Fabaceae and is endemic to the south-west of Western Australia. It is an erect shrub with pinnate leaves with five to fifteen leaflets, and yellow, red and orange, pea-like flowers.

== Description ==
Gompholobium preissii is an erect shrub that typically grows to a height of 10–40 cm (3.9–15.7 in). Its leaves are pinnate, 6–17 mm (0.24–0.67 in) long with five to fifteen leaflets. The flowers are mostly yellow or orange-red with brown, pink or purple markings, and are borne on pedicels 4.0–4.5 mm (0.16–0.18 in) long with bracteoles 3.5–5.0 mm (0.14–0.20 in) long attached. The sepals are 10–11 mm (0.39–0.43 in) long, the standard petal 10.0–10.2 mm (0.39–0.40 in) long, the wings 8.7–10 mm (0.34–0.39 in) long and the keel 7.6–8.2 mm (0.30–0.32 in) long. Flowering occurs from August to December and the fruit is a pod about 8 mm (0.31 in) long.

== Taxonomy ==
Gompholobium preissii was first formally described in 1844 by Carl Meissner in Lehmann's Plantae Preissianae. The specific epithet (preissii) honours Ludwig Preiss.

== Distribution and habitat ==
This species of gompholobium on lateritic soils and is widespread in the south-western of Western Australia.

== Conservation status ==
Gompholobium preissii is classified as "not threatened" by the Western Australian Government Department of Parks and Wildlife.
