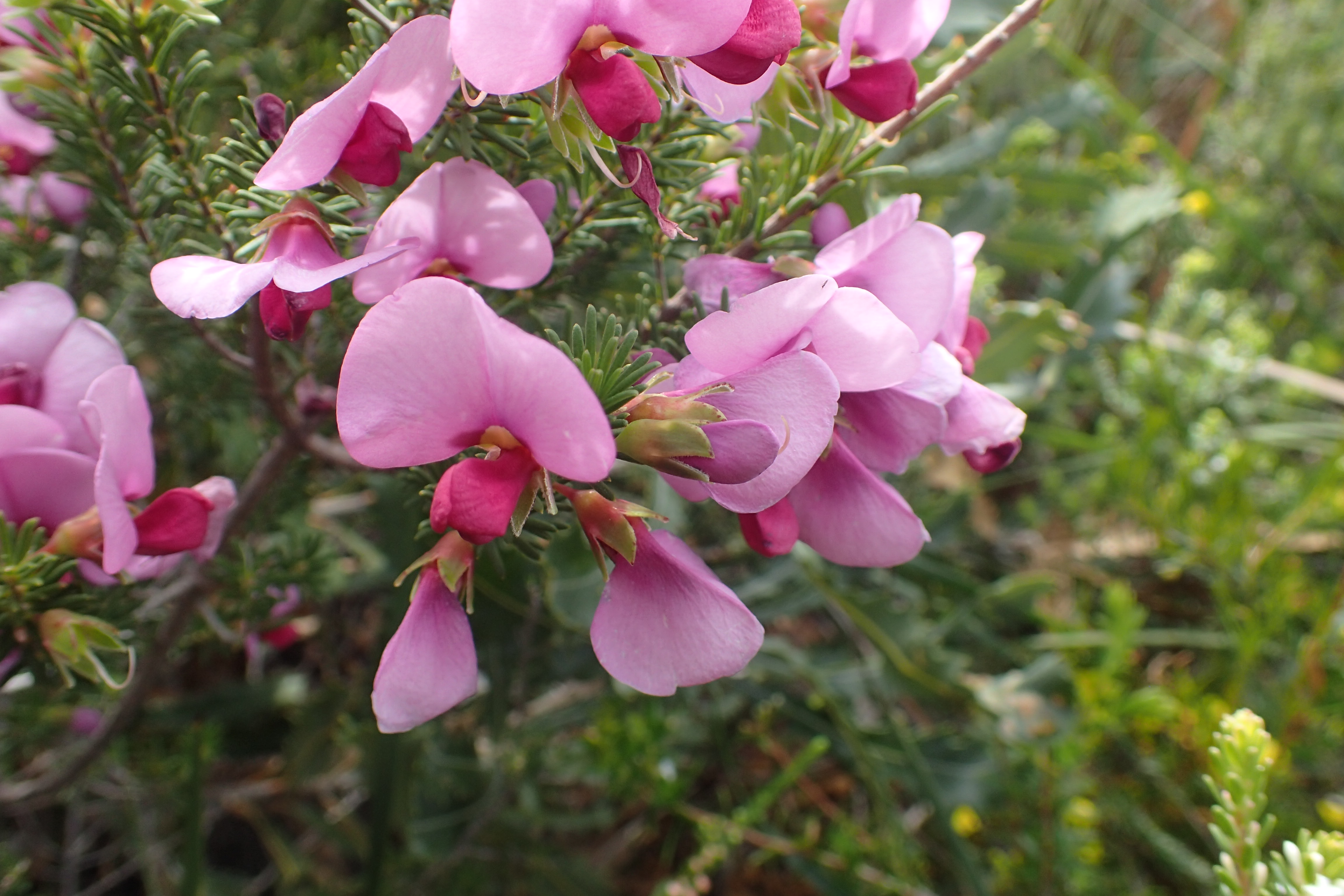
- Near East Mount Barren

Scientific classification
- Kingdom: Plantae
- Clade: Tracheophytes
- Clade: Angiosperms
- Clade: Eudicots
- Clade: Rosids
- Order: Fabales
- Family: Fabaceae
- Subfamily: Faboideae
- Genus: Gompholobium
- Species: G. scabrum

Binomial name
- Gompholobium scabrum Sm.

Synonyms
- Burtonia pulchella Meisn.; Burtonia scabra (Sm.) R.Br.

= Gompholobium scabrum =

Species of legume

Gompholobium scabrum is a species of flowering plant in the pea family Fabaceae and is endemic to the south-west of Western Australia. It is an erect to spreading shrub with linear leaves and pink or purple flowers with some darker markings.

== Description ==
Gompholobium scabrum is an erect or spreading shrub that typically grows to a height of 0.4–2.3 m (1 ft 4 in – 7 ft 7 in) and has glabrous stems. The leaves are arranged in whorls around the stem, linear with the edges curved downwards 8.5–11 mm (0.33–0.43 in) long and 0.6–1.0 mm (0.024–0.039 in) wide. The flowers are pink or purple with some darker markings, each flower on a pedicel 5.0–6.5 mm (0.20–0.26 in) long with bracteoles 1.2–1.4 mm (0.047–0.055 in) long. The sepals are 6.2–8.6 mm (0.24–0.34 in) long, the standard petal about 12 mm (0.47 in) long, the wings about 17 mm (0.67 in) long and the keel 10.5–14 mm (0.41–0.55 in) long. Flowering occurs from August to November and the fruit is a cylindrical pod.

== Taxonomy ==
Gompholobium scabrum was first formally described in 1808 by James Edward Smith in the Transactions of the Linnean Society of London. The specific epithet (scabrum) means "scabrous", referring to the stems.

== Distribution and habitat ==
This species of pea grows on undulating plains in the Avon Wheatbelt, Esperance Plains, Jarrah Forest, Mallee, Swan Coastal Plain and Warren biogeographic regions of south-western Western Australia.

== Conservation status ==
Gompholobium scabrum is classified as "not threatened" by the Government of Western Australia Department of Biodiversity, Conservation and Attractions.
