= Gompholobium viscidulum =

Scientific classification
- Kingdom: Plantae
- Clade: Tracheophytes
- Clade: Angiosperms
- Clade: Eudicots
- Clade: Rosids
- Order: Fabales
- Family: Fabaceae
- Subfamily: Faboideae
- Genus: Gompholobium
- Species: G. viscidulum

Binomial name
- Gompholobium viscidulum Meisn.

Species of legume

Gompholobium viscidulum is a species of flowering plant in the pea family Fabaceae and is endemic to the south-west of Western Australia. It is an erect shrub with pinnate leaves with five to seven leaflets, and yellow flowers.

== Description ==
Gompholobium viscidulum is an erect shrub that typically grows to a height of 20–45 cm (7.9–17.7 in) and has glabrous stems. The leaves are arranged alternately along the branches, pinnate and 10–18 mm (0.39–0.71 in) long with five to seven leaflets. The flowers are uniformly yellow, each flower on a pedicel 2.0–3.5 mm (0.079–0.138 in) long with bracteoles attached. The sepals are 8–9 mm (0.31–0.35 in) long, the standard petal 11.0–11.4 mm (0.43–0.45 in) long, the wings 8.2–9.4 mm (0.32–0.37 in) long and the keel 8.5–9.0 mm (0.33–0.35 in) long. Flowering occurs from September to November and the fruit is a cylindrical pod.

== Taxonomy ==
Gompholobium viscidulum was first formally described in 1844 by Carl Meissner in Lehmann's Plantae Preissianae. The specific epithet (viscidulum) means "somewhat sticky".

== Distribution and habitat ==
This species of pea grows on sandplains and on hillsides in the Avon Wheatbelt, Coolgardie, Esperance Plains and Mallee biogeographic regions of south-western Western Australia.

== Conservation status ==
Gompholobium viscidulum is classified as "not threatened" by the Government of Western Australia Department of Biodiversity, Conservation and Attractions.
