= Gompholobium obcordatum =

Scientific classification
- Kingdom: Plantae
- Clade: Tracheophytes
- Clade: Angiosperms
- Clade: Eudicots
- Clade: Rosids
- Order: Fabales
- Family: Fabaceae
- Subfamily: Faboideae
- Genus: Gompholobium
- Species: G. obcordatum

Binomial name
- Gompholobium obcordatum Turcz.

Synonyms
- Gompholobium obcordatum Turcz. var. obcordatum; Gompholobium obcordatum var. pachyphyllum C.A.Gardner

Species of flowering plant

Gompholobium obcordatum is a species of flowering plant in the family Fabaceae and is endemic to the south-west of Western Australia. It is an erect, open shrub with heart-shaped leaves, the narrower end towards the base, and uniformly yellow, pea-like flowers.

== Description ==
Gompholobium obcordatum is an erect, open shrub that typically grows to a height of 20–60 cm (7.9–23.6 in). Its leaves are heart-shaped with the narrower end towards the base, 3.8–6.0 mm (0.15–0.24 in) long, 03–3.5 mm (0.12–0.14 in) wide and glabrous. The flowers are uniformly yellow, borne on pedicels 3–5 mm (0.12–0.20 in) long with bracteoles attached. The sepals are 5–9 mm (0.20–0.35 in) long, the standard petal 6.5–10 mm (0.26–0.39 in) long, the wings 5.2–7.5 mm (0.20–0.30 in) long and the keel 5–8 mm (0.20–0.31 in) long. Flowering occurs from September to November and the fruit is a cylindrical pod.

== Taxonomy ==
Gompholobium obcordatum was first formally described in 1853 by Nikolai Turczaninow in the Bulletin de la Société impériale des naturalistes de Moscou from specimens collected by James Drummond. The specific epithet (obcordatum) means "inverted heart-shaped", referring to the leaves.

== Distribution and habitat ==
This species of gompholobium grows in sandy soil in the Avon Wheatbelt, Coolgardie and Geraldton Sandplains biogeographic regions of south-western Western Australia.

== Conservation status ==
Gompholobium obcordatum is classified as "not threatened" by the Western Australian Government Department of Parks and Wildlife.
