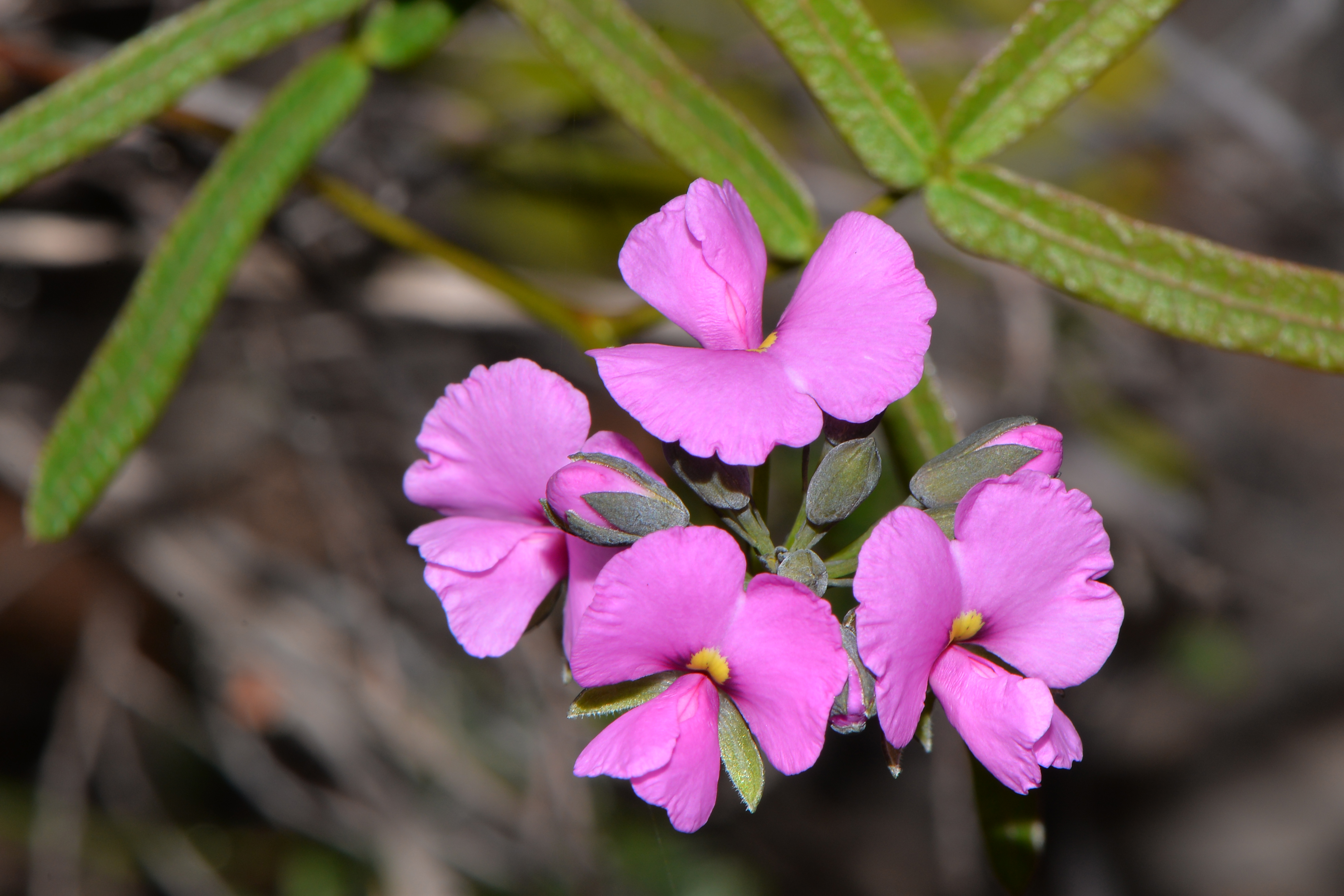

Scientific classification
- Kingdom: Plantae
- Clade: Tracheophytes
- Clade: Angiosperms
- Clade: Eudicots
- Clade: Rosids
- Order: Fabales
- Family: Fabaceae
- Subfamily: Faboideae
- Genus: Gompholobium
- Species: G. knightianum

Binomial name
- Gompholobium knightianum Lindl.

= Gompholobium knightianum =

Species of flowering plant

Gompholobium knightianum is a species of flowering plant in the family Fabaceae and is endemic to the south-west of Western Australia. It is a slender, erect shrub with pinnate leaves, and mostly pink or purple, pea-like flowers.

== Description ==
Gompholobium knightianum is a slender, erect shrub that typically grows to a height of 10–50 cm (3.9–19.7 in). Its leaves are pinnate, with three to five flat, glabrous leaflets 5–20 mm (0.20–0.79 in) long. The flowers are pink or purple, borne on a glabrous pedicel about 3.5 mm (0.14 in) long with glabrous sepals about 5.5 mm (0.22 in) long. The standard petal is about 7.6 mm (0.30 in) long, and the wings are about 7 mm (0.28 in) long. Flowering occurs from July to December and the fruit is a pod 4.5–9.3 mm (0.18–0.37 in) long.

== Taxonomy ==
Gompholobium knightianum was first formally described in 1831 by John Lindley in Edwards's Botanical Register from specimens grown in the "Mr Knight's Nursery" from seed collected by William Baxter.

== Distribution ==
This pea grows is found in the Avon Wheatbelt, Esperance Plains, Geraldton Sandplains, Jarrah Forest, Mallee, Swan Coastal Plain and Warren biogeographic regions in the south-west of Western Australia.

== Conservation status ==
Gompholobium knightianum is classified as "not threatened" by the Government of Western Australia Department of Parks and Wildlife.
