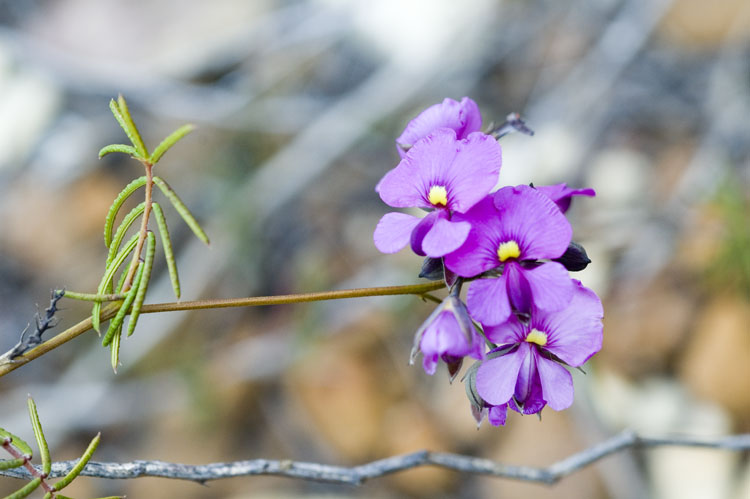
- Gompholobium venustum in the Fitzgerald River National Park

Scientific classification
- Kingdom: Plantae
- Clade: Embryophytes
- Clade: Tracheophytes
- Clade: Spermatophytes
- Clade: Angiosperms
- Clade: Eudicots
- Clade: Rosids
- Order: Fabales
- Family: Fabaceae
- Subfamily: Faboideae
- Genus: Gompholobium
- Species: G. venustum

Binomial name
- Gompholobium venustum R.Br.

Synonyms
- Gompholobium venustum R.Br. var. venustum

= Gompholobium venustum =

Handsome wedge-pea

Species of flowering plant

Gompholobium venustum, commonly known as handsome wedge-pea, is a species of flowering plant in the family Fabaceae and is endemic to the south-west of Western Australia. It is a slender, erect or sprawling shrub with pinnate leaves with fifteen to nineteen leaflets, and yellow or pink, pea-like flowers.

== Description ==
Gompholobium venustum is a slender, erect or sprawling shrub that typically grows to a height of 10–50 cm (3.9–19.7 in) and has glabrous stems. Its leaves are pinnate and 15–30 mm (0.59–1.18 in) long with fifteen to nineteen needle-shaped leaflets with one or two longitudinal grooves on the lower surface. The flowers are mostly yellow or pink, borne on glabrous pedicels 5–10 mm (0.20–0.39 in) long with bracteoles 1.2–1.6 mm (0.047–0.063 in) long, attached. The sepals are glabrous, 7–8 mm (0.28–0.31 in) long, the standard petal 9–10 mm (0.35–0.39 in) long, the wings 7.0–9.5 mm (0.28–0.37 in) long and the keel 8.0–8.5 mm (0.31–0.33 in) long. Flowering occurs from September to December and the fruit is a cylindrical pod 9.0–9.5 mm (0.35–0.37 in) long.

== Taxonomy ==
Gompholobium venustum was first formally described in 1811 by Robert Brown in Hortus Kewensis. The specific epithet (venustum) means "charming" or "beautiful".

== Distribution and habitat ==
This gompholobium grows on sandplains, ridges and outcrops in the Esperance Plains, Jarrah Forest, Mallee and Warren biogeographic regions of southern Western Australia.

== Conservation status ==
Gompholobium venustum is classified as "not threatened" by the Western Australian Government Department of Parks and Wildlife.
