= Gompholobium gairdnerianum =

Conservation status
- Priority Three — Poorly Known Taxa (DEC)

Scientific classification
- Kingdom: Plantae
- Clade: Tracheophytes
- Clade: Angiosperms
- Clade: Eudicots
- Clade: Rosids
- Order: Fabales
- Family: Fabaceae
- Subfamily: Faboideae
- Genus: Gompholobium
- Species: G. gairdnerianum

Binomial name
- Gompholobium gairdnerianum Chappill

Species of flowering plant

Gompholobium gairdnerianum is a species of flowering plant in the family Fabaceae and is endemic to the far west of Western Australia. It is an erect, slender, multistemmed shrub with yellow, pea-like flowers.

== Description ==
Gompholobium gairdnerianum is an erect, multi-stemmed shrub that typically grows to a height of up to 50 cm (20 in). Its leaves are 10–23 mm (0.39–0.91 in) long and 4–8 mm (0.16–0.31 in) wide with stipules 3.2–4.5 mm (0.13–0.18 in) long at the base. The flowers are uniformly yellow, and borne on a glabrous pedicel 5–9 mm (0.20–0.35 in) long with glabrous sepals 9.5–14 mm (0.37–0.55 in) long. The standard petal is 9–18.5 mm (0.35–0.73 in) long, the wings 7.6–9 mm (0.30–0.35 in) long and the keel 10–13.8 mm (0.39–0.54 in) long. Flowering occurs from September to November and the fruit is a glabrous pod 12–14 mm (0.47–0.55 in) long.

== Taxonomy ==
Gompholobium gairdnerianum was first formally described in 2008 by Jennifer Anne Chappill in Australian Systematic Botany from specimens collected near Mount Lesueur in 1979. The specific epithet (gairdnerianum) refers to the Gairdner Range where this species occurs.

== Distribution and habitat ==
This pea grows in sandy to gravelly soil and sand on hills and ridges in the Geraldton Sandplains biogeographic region in the far west of Western Australia.

== Conservation status ==
Gompholobium gairdnerianum is classified as "Priority Three" by the Government of Western Australia Department of Parks and Wildlife meaning that it is poorly known and known from only a few locations but is not under imminent threat.
