= Gompholobium cinereum =

Conservation status
- Priority Three — Poorly Known Taxa (DEC)

Scientific classification
- Kingdom: Plantae
- Clade: Tracheophytes
- Clade: Angiosperms
- Clade: Eudicots
- Clade: Rosids
- Order: Fabales
- Family: Fabaceae
- Subfamily: Faboideae
- Genus: Gompholobium
- Species: G. cinereum

Binomial name
- Gompholobium cinereum Chappill

Species of flowering plant

Gompholobium cinereum is a species of flowering plant in the family Fabaceae and is endemic to the south-west of Western Australia. It a shrub that typically grows to a height of up to 30 cm (12 in) and flowers from September to November producing purple, pea-like flowers. This species was first formally described in 2008 by Jennifer Anne Chappill in Australian Systematic Botany from specimens collected in Wilroy Nature Reserve, south of Mullewa in 1995. The specific epithet (cinereum) means "ash-coloured", referring to the overall appearance of the plant.

Gompholobium cinereum grows in open sites, slopes and roadsides in the Avon Wheatbelt, Coolgardie, Geraldton Sandplains and Yalgoo biogeographic regions of south-western Western Australia. It is classified as "Priority Three" by the Government of Western Australia Department of Parks and Wildlife, meaning that it is poorly known and known from only a few locations but is not under imminent threat.
