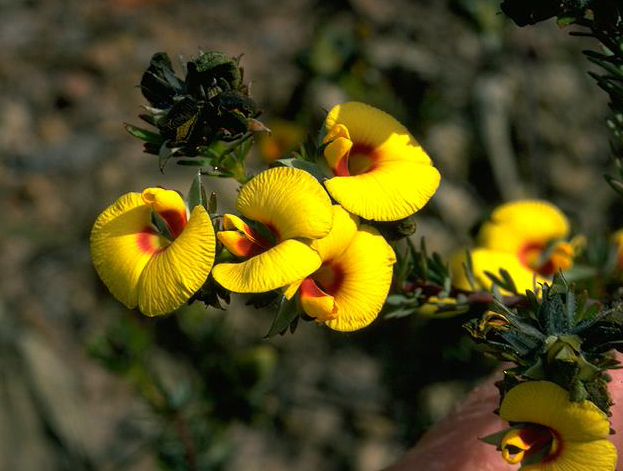
- In the Stirling Range National Park

Scientific classification
- Kingdom: Plantae
- Clade: Tracheophytes
- Clade: Angiosperms
- Clade: Eudicots
- Clade: Rosids
- Order: Fabales
- Family: Fabaceae
- Subfamily: Faboideae
- Genus: Gompholobium
- Species: G. burtonioides

Binomial name
- Gompholobium burtonioides Meisn.

Synonyms
- Gompholobium burtonioides Meisn. var. burtonioides; Gompholobium burtonioides var. subacerosum Meisn.; Gompholobium burtonioides var. subspathulatum Meisn.

= Gompholobium burtonioides =

Species of flowering plant

Gompholobium burtonioides is a species of flowering plant in the family Fabaceae and is endemic to the south-west of Western Australia. It an ascending shrub that typically grows to a height of 15–45 cm (5.9–17.7 in) and flowers from September to December producing yellow, pea-like flowers. This species was first formally described in 1844 by Carl Meissner in Lehmann's Plantae Preissianae. The specific epithet (burtonioides) means "Burtonia-like". (Burtonia is an earlier name for Gompholobium.)

Gompholobium burtonioides grows in swampy areas and on slopes in the Avon Wheatbelt, Esperance Plains, Jarrah Forest and Mallee biogeographic regions of south-western Western Australia.
