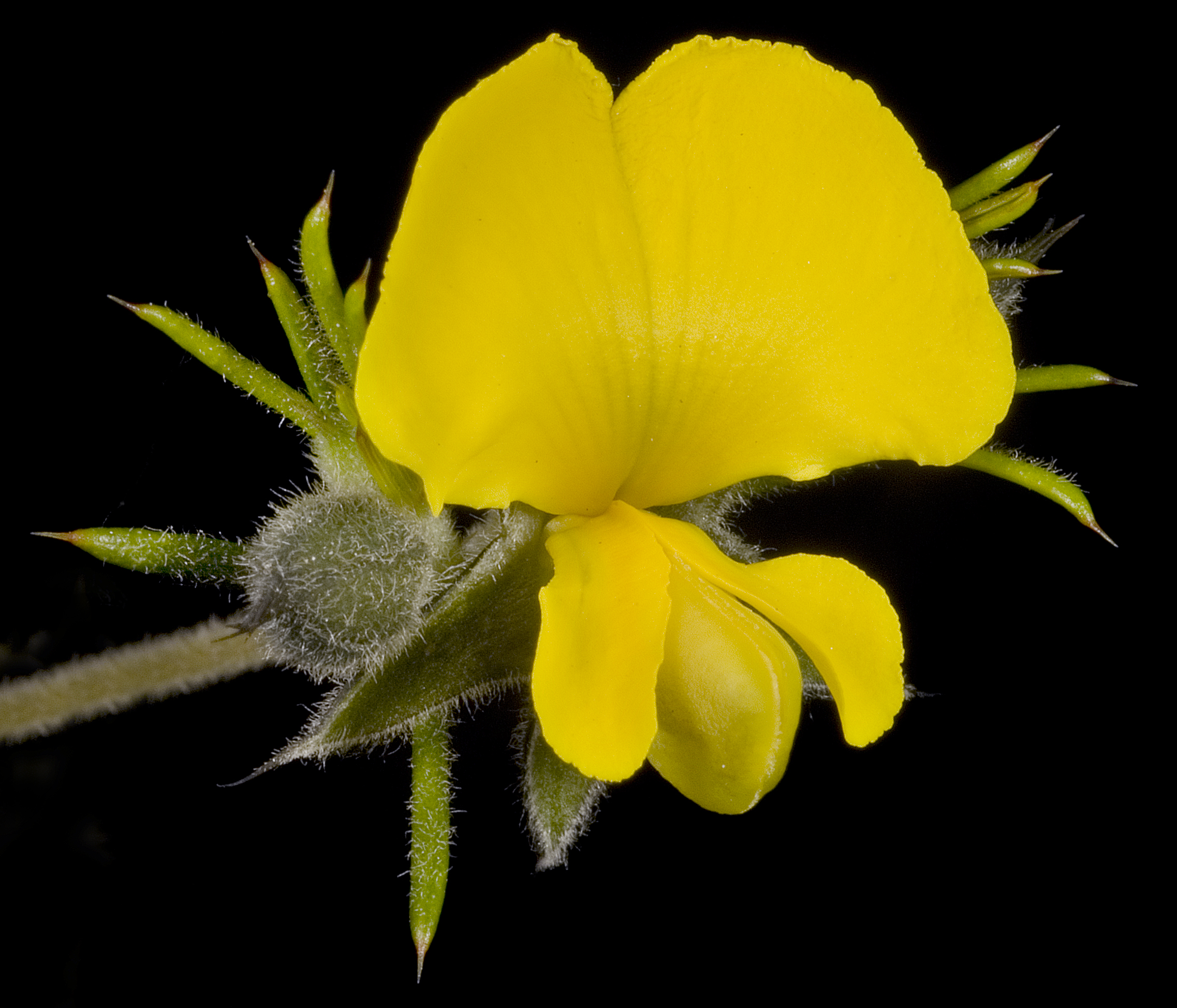

Scientific classification
- Kingdom: Plantae
- Clade: Embryophytes
- Clade: Tracheophytes
- Clade: Spermatophytes
- Clade: Angiosperms
- Clade: Eudicots
- Clade: Rosids
- Order: Fabales
- Family: Fabaceae
- Subfamily: Faboideae
- Genus: Gompholobium
- Species: G. aristatum

Binomial name
- Gompholobium aristatum Benth.

Synonyms
- Gompholobium aristatum Benth. var. aristatum; Gompholobium aristatum var. glabratum Benth.; Gompholobium aristatum var. hispidum Benth.

= Gompholobium aristatum =

Species of flowering plant

Gompholobium aristatum is a species of flowering plant in the family Fabaceae and is endemic to the south-west of Western Australia. It an erect shrub that typically grows to a height of 10–80 cm (3.9–31.5 in). It flowers between July and December producing yellow, pea-like flowers. This species was first formally described in 1837 by George Bentham in Stephan Endlicher's Enumeratio plantarum quas in Novae Hollandiae ora austro-occidentali ad fluvium Cygnorum et in sinu Regis Georgii collegit Carolus Liber Baro de Hügel from specimens collected in the Swan River Colony. The specific epithet (aristatum) means "awned", referring to the leaves.

Gompholobium aristatum grows on sandplains and in winter-wet depressions in the Avon Wheatbelt, Geraldton Sandplains, Jarrah Forest and Swan Coastal Plain biogeographic regions of south-western Western Australia.
