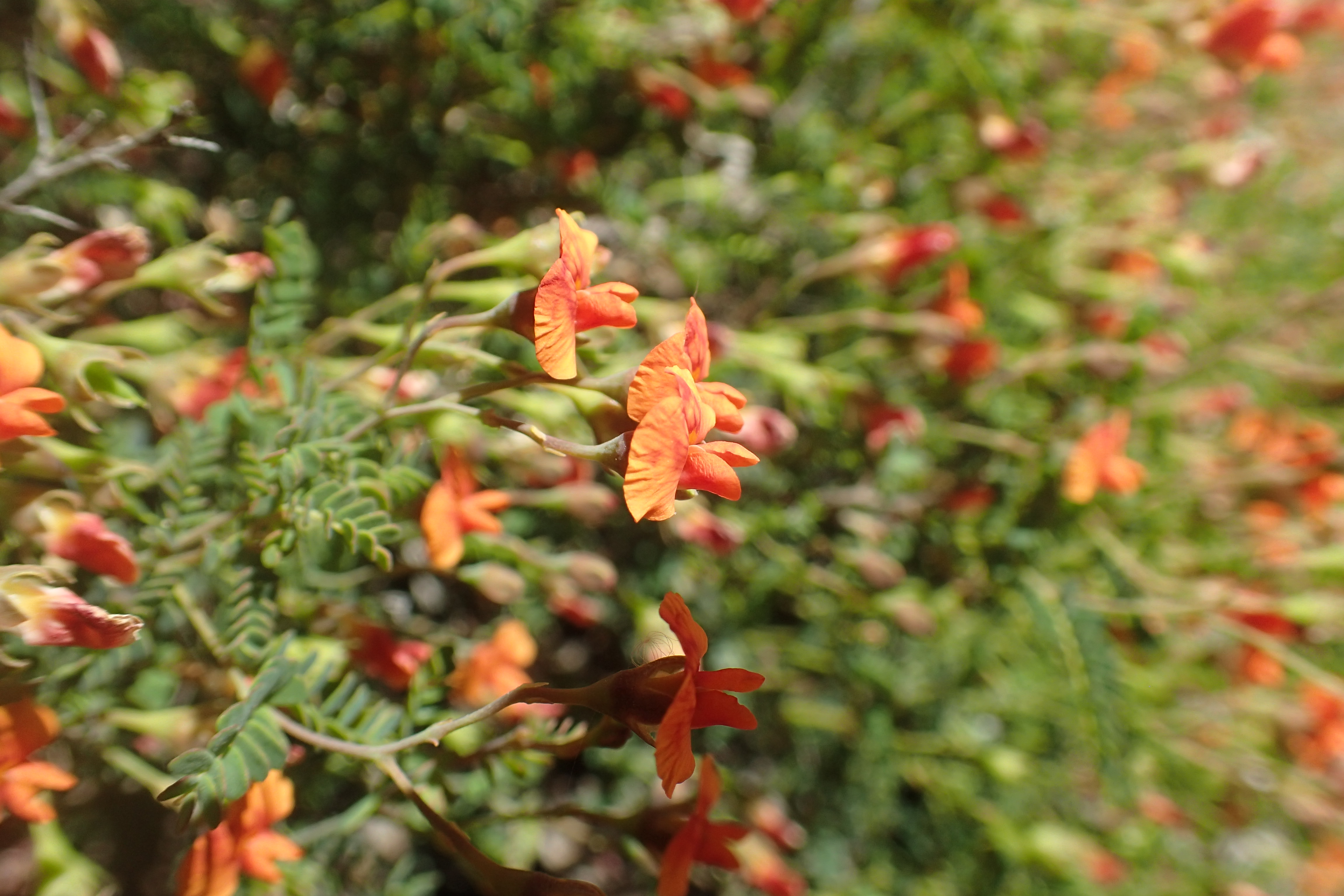
- In the Pilliga Nature Reserve

Scientific classification
- Kingdom: Plantae
- Clade: Tracheophytes
- Clade: Angiosperms
- Clade: Eudicots
- Clade: Rosids
- Order: Fabales
- Family: Fabaceae
- Subfamily: Faboideae
- Genus: Gompholobium
- Species: G. foliolosum

Binomial name
- Gompholobium foliolosum Benth.

Synonyms
- Burtonia foliolosa (Benth.) Benth.; Burtonia foliosa S.W.L.Jacobs & J.Pickard orth. var.

= Gompholobium foliolosum =

Fern-leaved burtonia

Species of flowering plant

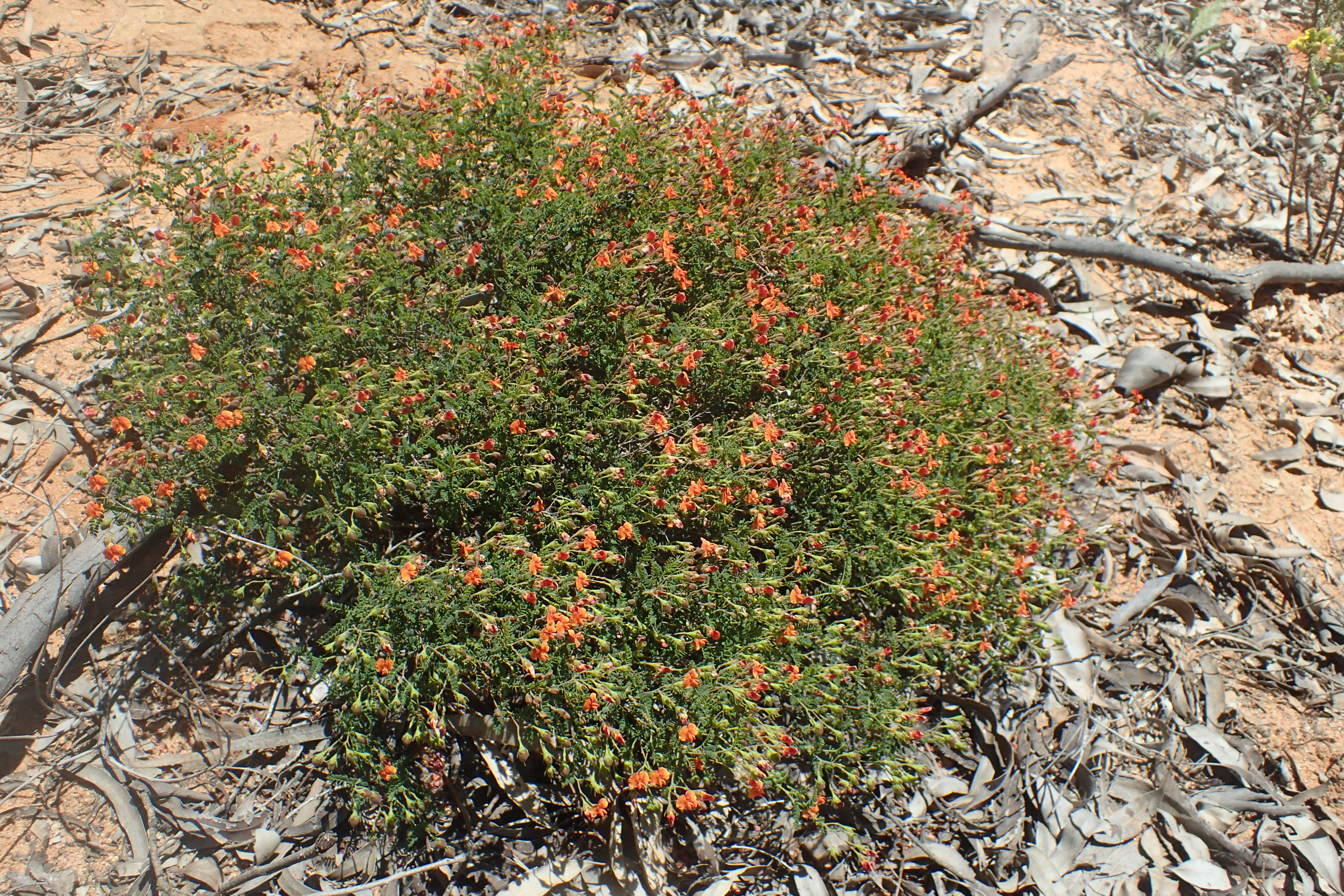
Habit

Gompholobium foliolosum is a species of flowering plant in the family Fabaceae and is endemic to eastern Australia. It is an erect shrub with pinnate leaves and orange-red, pea-like flowers.

== Description ==
Gompholobium foliolosum is an erect, more or less glaucous shrub that typically grows to a height of up to 1 m (3 ft 3 in). The leaves are pinnate, 11–21 mm (0.43–0.83 in) long, the leaflets wedge-shaped, egg-shaped or heart-shaped with the narrower end towards the base, 2–4 mm (0.079–0.157 in) long, 1.0–1.5 mm (0.039–0.059 in) wide and more or less glabrous. The flowers are arranged in small groups on the ends of branchlets, each flower on a pedicel 4–7 mm (0.16–0.28 in) long. The sepals are about 4 mm (0.16 in) long and the flowers are orange-red and 5–6 mm (0.20–0.24 in) long. Flowering occurs in spring and the fruit is a more or less spherical pod about 5 mm (0.20 in) long.

== Taxonomy and naming ==
Gompholobium foliolosum was first formally described in 1837 by George Bentham in Thomas Mitchell's Journal of an Expedition into the Interior of Tropical Australia. The specific epithet (foliolosum) means "leafy".

== Distribution ==
Fern-leaved burtonia grows in Queensland and in the Coonabarabran area in New South Wales.
