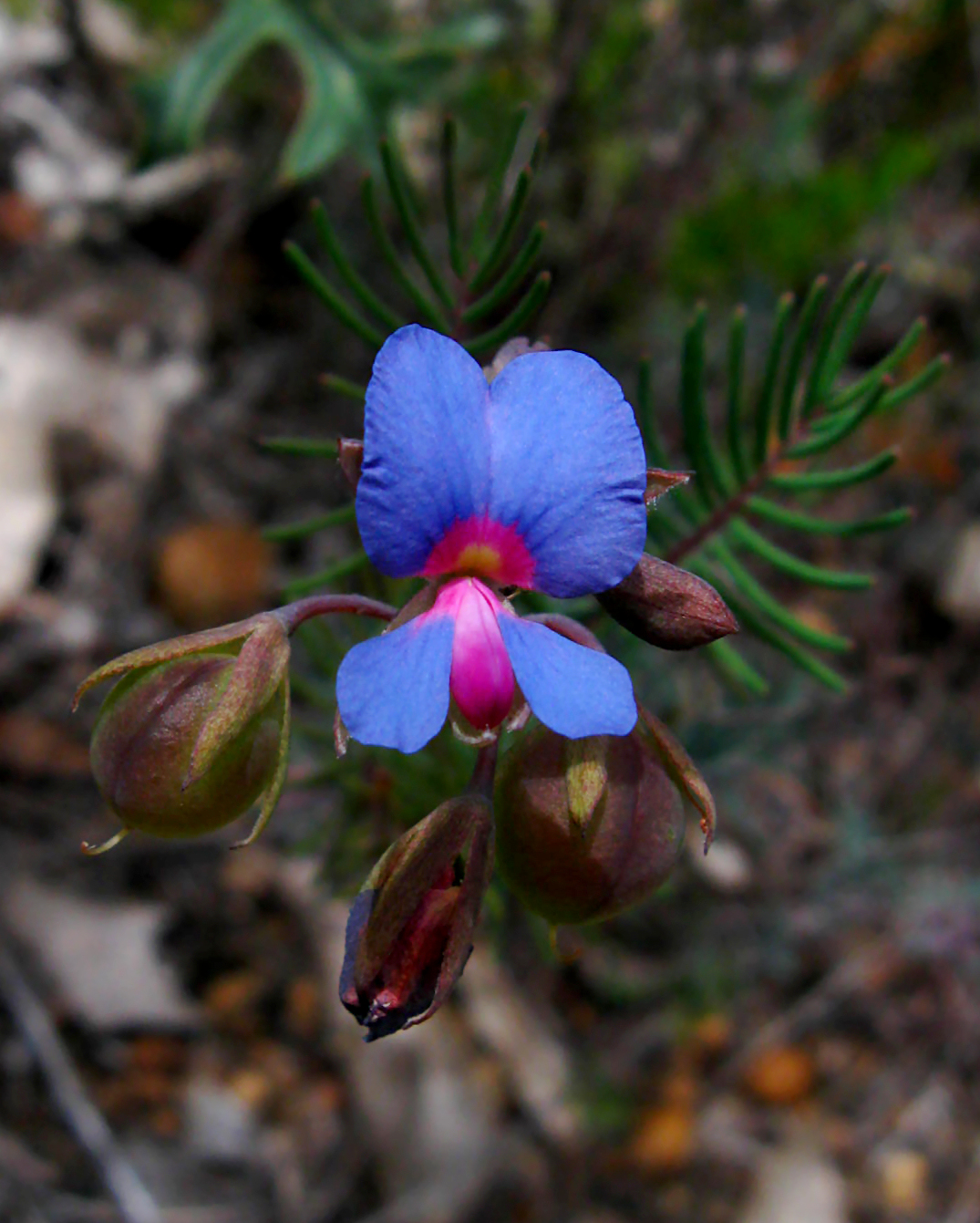

Scientific classification
- Kingdom: Plantae
- Clade: Tracheophytes
- Clade: Angiosperms
- Clade: Eudicots
- Clade: Rosids
- Order: Fabales
- Family: Fabaceae
- Subfamily: Faboideae
- Genus: Gompholobium
- Species: G. cyaninum

Binomial name
- Gompholobium cyaninum Chappill

= Gompholobium cyaninum =

Species of flowering plant

Gompholobium cyaninum is a species of flowering plant in the family Fabaceae and is endemic to the south-west of Western Australia. It is an erect to straggling shrub with pinnate leaves and blue, purple and red, pea-like flowers.

== Description ==
Gompholobium cyaninum is an erect to straggling shrub that typically grows to a height of 7–60 cm (2.8–23.6 in). It has pinnate leaves with fifteen to nineteen leaflets with a stipule at the base of the leaf. Each flowers is borne on a hairy pedicel 4–6 mm (0.16–0.24 in) long with sometimes hairy sepals 7.6–10.4 mm (0.30–0.41 in) long. The flowers are red and blue or purple, the standard petal 10–12 mm (0.39–0.47 in) long, the wings 7.6–9 mm (0.30–0.35 in) long and the keel 8–9 mm (0.31–0.35 in) long. Flowering occurs from September to December and the fruit is a cylindrical pod.

== Taxonomy ==
Gompholobium cyaninum was first formally described in 2008 by Jennifer Anne Chappill in Australian Systematic Botany from specimens collected near Wandering in 2000. The specific epithet (cyaninum) means "deep blue".

== Distribution and habitat ==
This pea grows in sandy to gravelly soil on plains slopes and valleys in the Avon Wheatbelt, Esperance Plains, Jarrah Forest, Mallee, Swan Coastal Plain and Warren biogeographic regions of south-western Western Australia.

== Conservation status ==
Gompholobium cyaninum is classified as "not threatened" by the Western Australian Government Department of Parks and Wildlife.
