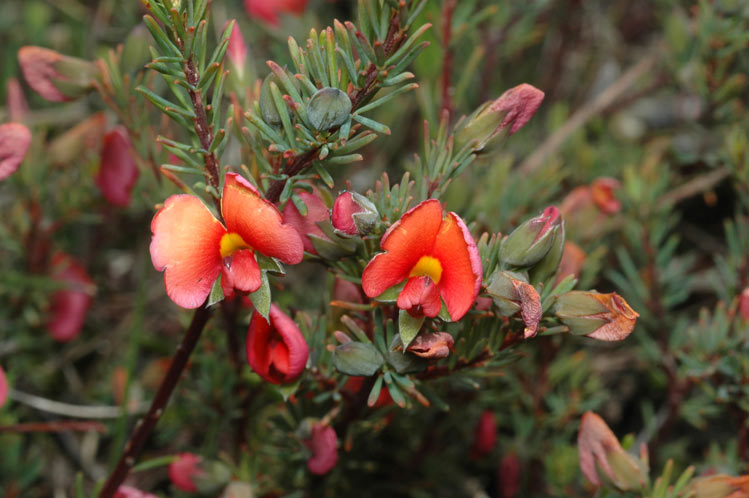
- Gompholobium uncinatum near Newnes

Scientific classification
- Kingdom: Plantae
- Clade: Tracheophytes
- Clade: Angiosperms
- Clade: Eudicots
- Clade: Rosids
- Order: Fabales
- Family: Fabaceae
- Subfamily: Faboideae
- Genus: Gompholobium
- Species: G. uncinatum

Binomial name
- Gompholobium uncinatum A.Cunn. ex Benth.

Synonyms
- Gompholobium aduncum G.Don nom. inval., nom. nud.; Gompholobium aduncum Loudon nom. inval., nom. nud.

= Gompholobium uncinatum =

Red wedge pea

Species of flowering plant

Gompholobium uncinatum, commonly known as red wedge pea, is a species of flowering plant in the family Fabaceae and is endemic to eastern Australia. It is a small, low-lying shrub with trifoliate leaves, the leaflets linear to narrow lance-shaped, and red, or orange-red and yellow-green, pea-like flowers.

== Description ==
Gompholobium uncinatum is an openly-branched, low-lying or sprawling shrub that typically grows to a height of 35–90 cm (14–35 in) and has pimply stems. The leaves are trifoliate, the leaflets linear to narrow lance-shaped, 4–12 mm (0.16–0.47 in) long and about 1 mm (0.039 in) wide with the edges curved down or rolled under and the tips often with a hooked tip. The flowers are arranged singly or in small groups, each flower on a pedicel 3–6 mm (0.12–0.24 in) long. The sepals are 5–7 mm (0.20–0.28 in) long and the petals are red or orange-red, 7–12 mm (0.28–0.47 in) long, often with yellow-green markings. Flowering occurs in summer and the fruit is a spherical to oval pod 7–10 mm (0.28–0.39 in) long.

== Taxonomy and naming ==
Gompholobium uncinatum was first formally described in 1837 by George Bentham from an unpublished description by Allan Cunningham. Bentham's description was published in Commentationes de Leguminosarum Generibus. The specific epithet (uncinatum) means "hooked".

== Distribution and habitat ==
Red wedge pea grows in heathland and forest from south-east Queensland to the Blue Mountains in New South Wales.
