= Gompholobium subulatum =

Scientific classification
- Kingdom: Plantae
- Clade: Tracheophytes
- Clade: Angiosperms
- Clade: Eudicots
- Clade: Rosids
- Order: Fabales
- Family: Fabaceae
- Subfamily: Faboideae
- Genus: Gompholobium
- Species: G. subulatum

Binomial name
- Gompholobium subulatum Benth.

Synonyms
- Burtonia subulata (Benth.) Benth.; Gompholobium stenophyllum F.Muell.

Species of legume

Gompholobium subulatum is a species of flowering plant in the pea family Fabaceae and is endemic to northern Australia. It is a slender, erect shrub with pinnate leaves with five to eleven leaflets, and uniformly yellow, pea-like flowers.

== Description ==
Gompholobium subulatum is a slender, erect shrub that typically grows to a height of up to 0.3–1 m (1–3 ft) and has glabrous stems. The leaves are pinnate, arranged alternately along the branchlets and 30–40 mm (1–2 in) long with five to eleven leaflets appearing cylindrical, but with the edges curved downwards and one or two grooves along the lower surface. The flowers are uniformly yellow, each flower on a pedicel 5.6–6.0 mm (0.22–0.24 in) long with bracteoles on the pedicel. The sepals are about 7.5 mm (0.3 in) long, the standard petal about 8 mm (0.31 in) long, the wings about 6.5 mm (0.26 in) long and the keel about 8 mm (0.3 in) long. Flowering occurs from March to August and the fruit is a glabrous pod about 7.5 mm (0.3 in) long.

== Taxonomy ==
Gompholobium subulatum was first formally described in 1837 by George Bentham in Commentationes de Leguminosarum Generibus. The specific epithet (subulatum) means "awl-shaped", referring to the leaflets.

== Distribution and habitat ==
This species of pea grows on rocky outcrops in the Central Kimberley, Northern Kimberley and Victoria Bonaparte biogeographic regions of Western Australia and the Northern Territory.

== Conservation status ==
Gompholobium subulatum is classified as "not threatened" by the Government of Western Australia Department of Biodiversity, Conservation and Attractions.
