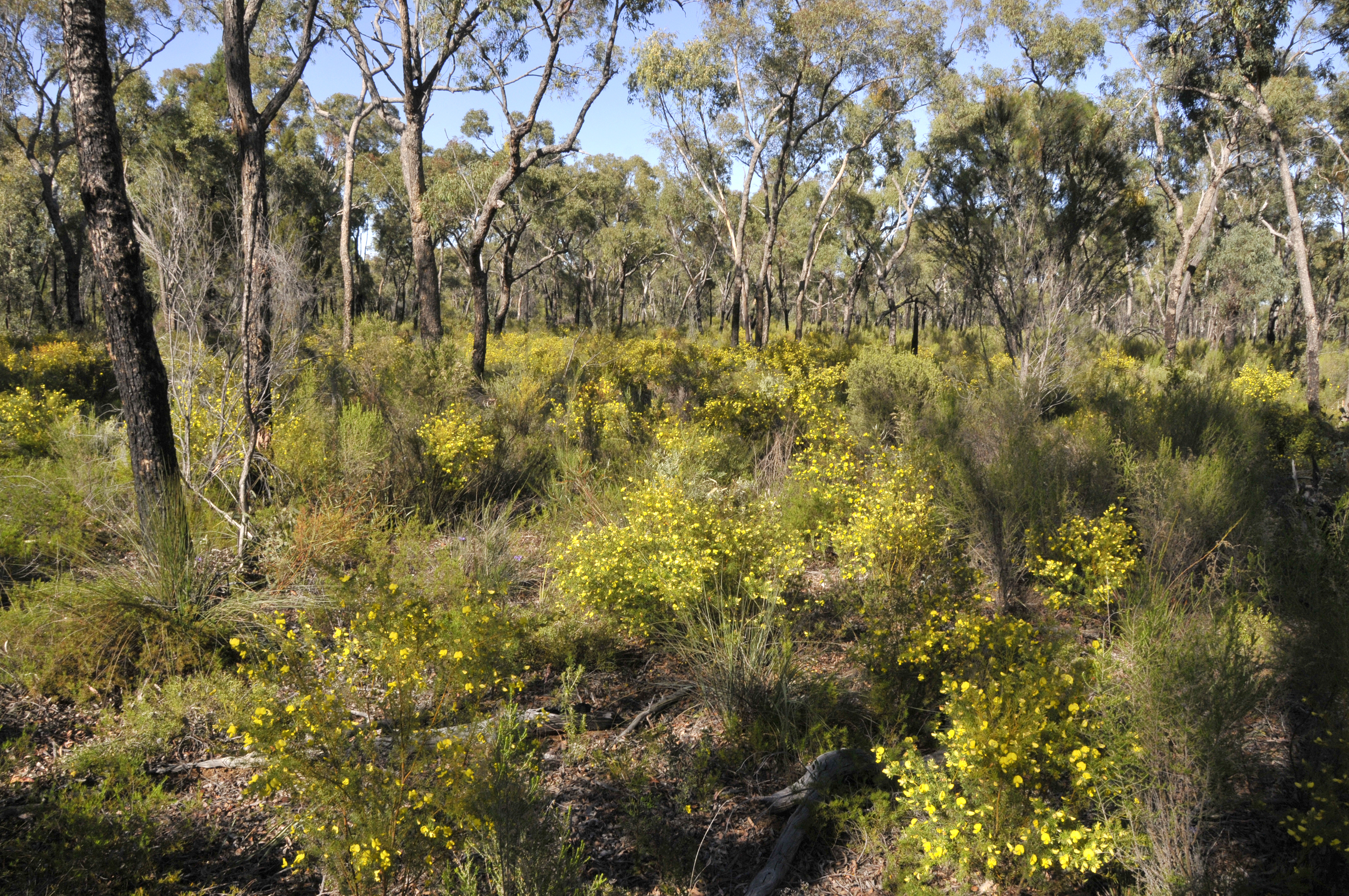
- In the Pilliga forest

Scientific classification
- Kingdom: Plantae
- Clade: Tracheophytes
- Clade: Angiosperms
- Clade: Eudicots
- Clade: Rosids
- Order: Fabales
- Family: Fabaceae
- Subfamily: Faboideae
- Genus: Gompholobium
- Species: G. aspalathoides

Binomial name
- Gompholobium aspalathoides A.Cunn. ex Benth.

Synonyms
- Gompholobium virgatum var. aspalathoides (A.Cunn. ex Benth.) Benth.

= Gompholobium aspalathoides =

Species of flowering plant

Gompholobium aspalathoides is a species of flowering plant in the family Fabaceae and is endemic to eastern Australia. It is an erect, more or less glabrous shrub with trifoliate leaves with linear to narrow elliptic leaflets, and yellow pea-like flowers.

== Description ==
Gompholobium aspalathoides is an erect, more or less glabrous shrub that typically grows up to 2 m (6 ft 7 in) high and 0.75 m (2 ft 6 in) wide. The leaves are trifoliate, the leaflets linear to narrow elliptic, 9–17 mm (0.35–0.67 in) long and 0.6–0.8 mm (0.024–0.031 in) wide with the edges rolled under and the tip truncated. The flowers are arranged singly or in groups of up to five in leaf axils, each flower on a pedicel 3–6 mm (0.12–0.24 in) long. The sepals are 6–7 mm (0.24–0.28 in) long and the petals are yellow, 12–20 mm (0.47–0.79 in) long. Flowering occurs from May to January and the fruit is an oblique oblong pod about 10 mm (0.39 in) long.

== Taxonomy ==
Gompholobium aspalathoides was first formally described in 1837 by George Bentham from an unpublished description by Allan Cunningham. Bentham's description was published in Commentationes de Leguminosarum Generibus. The specific epithet (aspalathoides) means "Aspalathus-like".

== Distribution and habitat ==
This species of pea grows in heath, woodland and forest and is widespread in inland areas from near Bundaberg in Queensland to near Moruya in New South Wales.
