= Gompholobium muticum =

Scientific classification
- Kingdom: Plantae
- Clade: Tracheophytes
- Clade: Angiosperms
- Clade: Eudicots
- Clade: Rosids
- Order: Fabales
- Family: Fabaceae
- Subfamily: Faboideae
- Genus: Gompholobium
- Species: G. muticum

Binomial name
- Gompholobium muticum (Benth.) Chappill

Synonyms
- Gompholobium aristatum var. muticum Benth.; Gompholobium drummondii Meisn. nom. illeg.; Gompholobium sp. 'Eneabba' (E.A.Griffin 5560)

Species of flowering plant

Gompholobium muticum is a species of flowering plant in the family Fabaceae and is endemic to the south-west of Western Australia. It is a low, bushy shrub with grooved, cylindrical leaves and pink or green, pea-like flowers.

== Description ==
Gompholobium muticum is a rounded, bushy shrub that typically grows to a height of up to 1 m (3 ft 3 in). Its leaves are cylindrical, 8–12 mm (0.31–0.47 in) long and 0.5–0.8 mm (0.020–0.031 in) wide but with one or two longitudinal grooves on the lower surface. The flowers are pink or green with pink or green markings, borne on pedicels 7–15 mm (0.28–0.59 in) long with hairy bracteoles 3–6 mm (0.12–0.24 in) long. The sepals are hairy, 10–13 mm (0.39–0.51 in) long, the standard petal 13–15 mm (0.51–0.59 in) long, the wings 10.5–11.5 mm (0.41–0.45 in) long and the keel 10–12 mm (0.39–0.47 in) long. Flowering occurs from October to November and the fruit is a cylindrical pod.

== Taxonomy ==
This species was first formally described in 1864 by George Bentham, who gave it the name Gompholobium aristatum var. muticum in Flora Australiensis. In 2008, Jennifer Anne Chappill raised the variety to species status as Gompholobium muticum in Australian Systematic Botany. The specific epithet (muticum) means "blunt", referring to the leaves.

== Distribution and habitat ==
Gompholobium muticum grows in depressions, flats, hills and roadsides in the Avon Wheatbelt, Geraldton Sandplains, Jarrah Forest and Swan Coastal Plain biogeographic regions of south-western Western Australia.

== Conservation status ==
Gompholobium muticum is classified as "not threatened" by the Western Australian Government Department of Parks and Wildlife.
