= Gompholobium gompholobioides =

Scientific classification
- Kingdom: Plantae
- Clade: Tracheophytes
- Clade: Angiosperms
- Clade: Eudicots
- Clade: Rosids
- Order: Fabales
- Family: Fabaceae
- Subfamily: Faboideae
- Genus: Gompholobium
- Species: G. gompholobioides

Binomial name
- Gompholobium gompholobioides (F.Muell.) Crisp

Species of flowering plant

Gompholobium gompholobioides is a species of flowering plant in the family Fabaceae and is endemic to the south-west of Western Australia. It is a spreading shrub with pinnate leaves and uniformly yellow, pea-like flowers.

== Description ==
Gompholobium gompholobioides is a spreading shrub that typically grows to a height of 7–40 cm (2.8–15.7 in). Its leaves are pinnate with an odd number of leaflets that are 3.5–5.5 mm (0.14–0.22 in) long with stipules at the base of the leaf. The flowers are uniformly yellow, borne on a glabrous pedicel 1.0–1.5 mm (0.039–0.059 in) long with hairy sepals 6.0–6.5 mm (0.24–0.26 in) long. The standard petal is 6–8 mm (0.24–0.31 in) long, the wings 5.0–6.6 mm (0.20–0.26 in) long and the keel 5.0–6.5 mm (0.20–0.26 in) long. Flowering occurs from September to March and the fruit is a pod.

== Taxonomy ==
This pea was first formally in 1876 by Ferdinand von Mueller who gave it the name Burtonia gompholobioides in Fragmenta Phytographiae Australiae. In 1987, Michael Crisp changed the name to Gompholobium gompholobioides. The specific epithet (gompholobioides) means "like Gastrolobium" - the species was initially given the name Burtonia gompholobioides.

== Distribution and habitat ==
This pea grows on sand dunes and plains in the Avon Wheatbelt, Coolgardie, Esperance Plains, Geraldton Sandplains, Great Victoria Desert, Mallee and Yalgoo biogeographic regions in the far west of Western Australia.

== Conservation status ==
Gompholobium gompholobioides is classified as "not threatened" by the Government of Western Australia Department of Parks and Wildlife.
