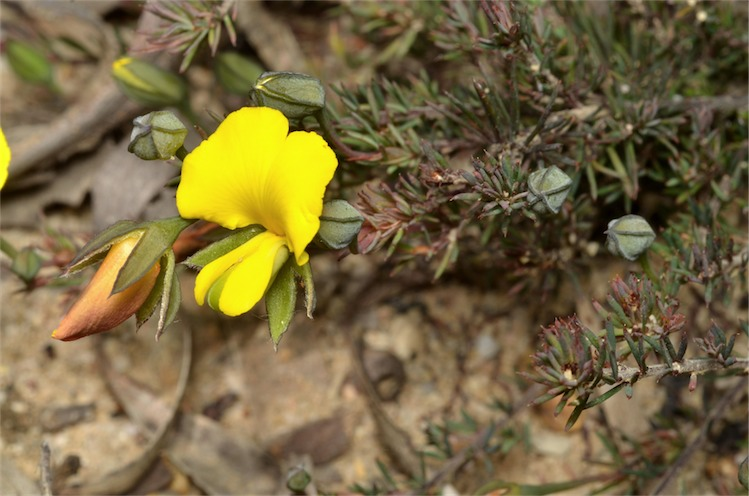
- Gompholobium minus near Braidwood

Scientific classification
- Kingdom: Plantae
- Clade: Tracheophytes
- Clade: Angiosperms
- Clade: Eudicots
- Clade: Rosids
- Order: Fabales
- Family: Fabaceae
- Subfamily: Faboideae
- Genus: Gompholobium
- Species: G. minus

Binomial name
- Gompholobium minus Sm.

Synonyms
- Burtonia minor (Sm.) DC.; Burtonia minor β sessilifolia (DC.) Steud.; Burtonia sessilifolia DC.; Gompholobium minus Sm. var. minus; Gompholobium tetrathecoides Sieber ex DC.

= Gompholobium minus =

Dwarf wedge-pea

Species of legume

Gompholobium minus, commonly known as dwarf wedge-pea, is a species of flowering plant in the pea family Fabaceae and is endemic to New South Wales. It is a low, spreading shrub with trifoliate leaves and yellow flowers.

== Description ==
Gompholobium minus is a low, spreading or prostrate shrub that typically grows to a height of 10–30 cm (3.9–11.8 in) and has hairy young foliage. The leaves are trifoliate with linear to lance-shaped leaflets with the narrower end towards the base, 5–12 mm (0.20–0.47 in) long and 0.5–1.0 mm (0.020–0.039 in) wide with a downcurved point on the tip and the edges curved down. The flowers are 8–15 mm (0.31–0.59 in) long and arranged singly or in small groups on the ends of branches, each flower on a pedicel 5–20 mm (0.20–0.79 in) long. The sepals are 7–12 mm (0.28–0.47 in) long, the standard petal and wings are yellow and the keel is often green. Flowering occurs in spring and the fruit is an oval pod 8–10 mm (0.31–0.39 in) long.

== Taxonomy ==
Gompholobium minus was first formally described in 1805 by James Edward Smith in Annals of Botany. The specific epithet (minus) means "smaller".

== Distribution and habitat ==
Dwarf wedge-pea grows in forest, woodland, heathland and scrub and is widespread on the coast and ranges of New South Wales south from the Hunter Valley.
