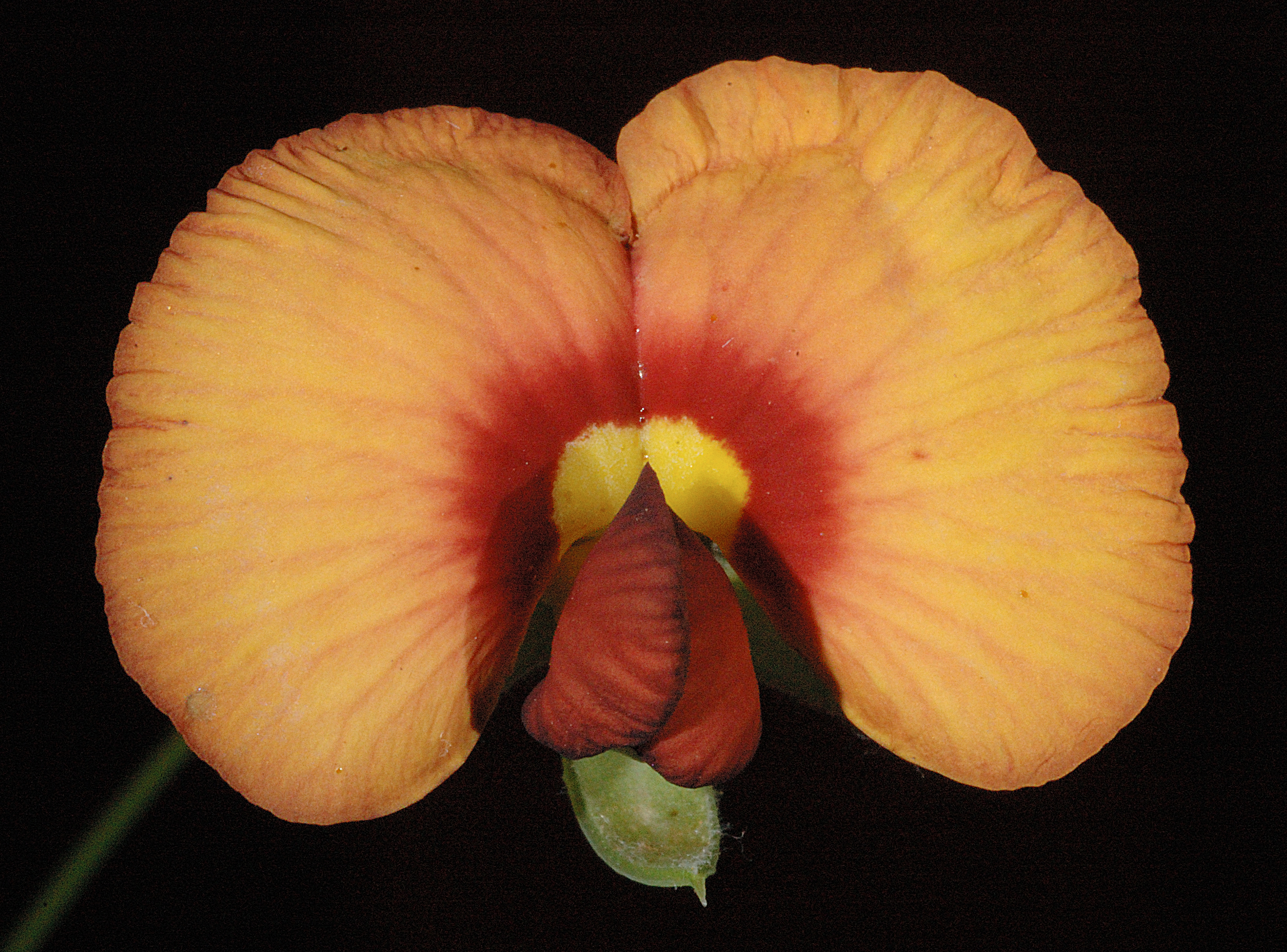

Scientific classification
- Kingdom: Plantae
- Clade: Embryophytes
- Clade: Tracheophytes
- Clade: Spermatophytes
- Clade: Angiosperms
- Clade: Eudicots
- Clade: Rosids
- Order: Fabales
- Family: Fabaceae
- Subfamily: Faboideae
- Genus: Gompholobium
- Species: G. polymorphum

Binomial name
- Gompholobium polymorphum R.Br.

= Gompholobium polymorphum =

Species of flowering plant

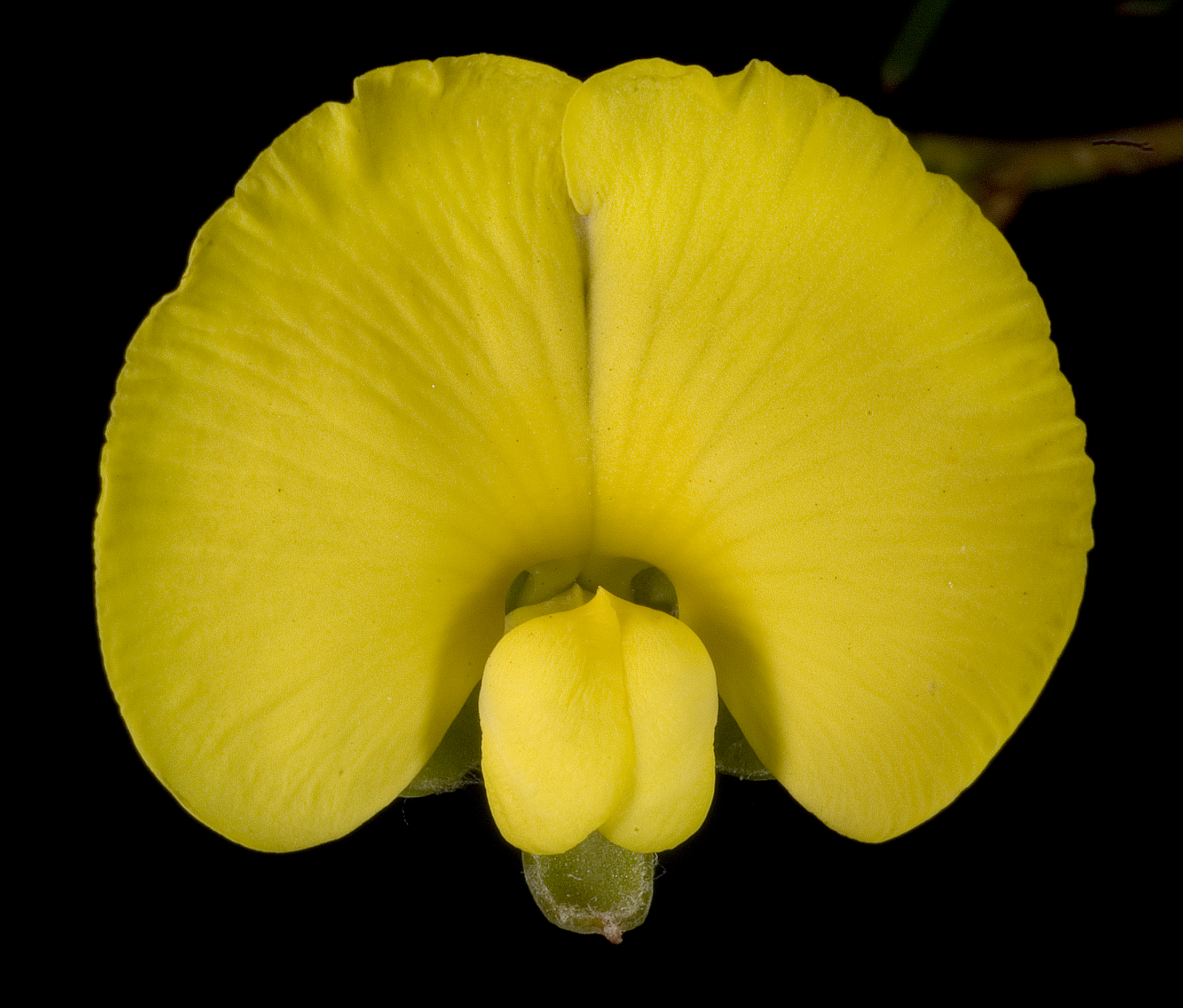
Yellow form

Gompholobium polymorphum is a species of flowering plant in the family Fabaceae and is endemic to the south-west of Western Australia. It is a bushy, straggling shrub or climber with cylindrical leaves with longitudinal grooves and yellow, red or orange, pea-like flowers with yellow, red or orange marks.

== Description ==
Gompholobium polymorphum is a bushy, straggling shrub or climber that typically grows to a height of 5–60 cm (2.0–23.6 in). Its leaves are cylindrical with one or two longitudinal grooves on the lower surface, 8–30 mm (0.31–1.18 in) long and 0.6–3.2 mm (0.024–0.126 in) wide. The flowers are usually yellow, red or orange with yellow, red or orange markings, borne on glabrous pedicels 10–19 mm (0.39–0.75 in) long with bracteoles 2.0–4.5 mm (0.079–0.177 in) long, attached. The sepals are glabrous, 8–11 mm (0.31–0.43 in) long, the standard petal 10–18 mm (0.39–0.71 in) long, the wings 10–11.5 mm (0.39–0.45 in) long and the keel 9–10.5 mm (0.35–0.41 in) long. Flowering occurs from September to January and the fruit is a pod about 8 mm (0.31 in) long and wide.

== Taxonomy ==
Gompholobium polymorphum was first formally described in 1811 by Robert Brown in Hortus Kewensis. The specific epithet (polymorphum) means "many-shaped", referring to the variable form of this species.

== Distribution and habitat ==
This gompholobium grows in lateritic or granitic soils in the Avon Wheatbelt, Esperance Plains, Jarrah Forest, Mallee, Swan Coastal Plain and Warren biogeographic regions of south-western Western Australia.

== Conservation status ==
Gompholobium polymorphum is classified as "not threatened" by the Western Australian Government Department of Parks and Wildlife.
