= Gompholobium wonganense =

Conservation status
- Priority Three — Poorly Known Taxa (DEC)

Scientific classification
- Kingdom: Plantae
- Clade: Tracheophytes
- Clade: Angiosperms
- Clade: Eudicots
- Clade: Rosids
- Order: Fabales
- Family: Fabaceae
- Subfamily: Faboideae
- Genus: Gompholobium
- Species: G. wonganense

Binomial name
- Gompholobium wonganense Chappill

Species of flowering plant

Gompholobium wonganense is a species of flowering plant in the family Fabaceae and is endemic to the Wongan Hills area of Western Australia. It is an erect, spreading shrub with simple leaves and uniformly yellow, pea-like flowers.

== Description ==
Gompholobium wonganense is an erect, spreading shrub that typically grows to a height of up to 1.2 m (3 ft 11 in) and has hairy stems. The leaves are simple, 5–10 mm (0.20–0.39 in) long and 0.8–1 mm (0.031–0.039 in) wide with the edges rolled under. The flowers are uniformly yellow, borne on hairy pedicels 4.0–4.2 mm (0.16–0.17 in) long with hairy bracteoles 1.6–1.8 mm (0.063–0.071 in) long attached. The sepals are 9–10 mm (0.35–0.39 in) long and hairy, the standard petal 9.0–10.5 mm (0.35–0.41 in) long, the wings 7–8 mm (0.28–0.31 in) long, and the keel 8.0–9.2 mm (0.31–0.36 in) long. Flowering occurs from September to November and the fruit is a cylindrical pod.

== Taxonomy ==
Gompholobium wonganense was first formally described in 2008 by Jennifer Anne Chappill in Australian Systematic Botany from specimens collected near the Wongan Hills in 1983. The specific epithet (wonganense) means "native of Wongan Hills".

== Distribution ==
This pea is found near Wongan Hills in the Avon Wheatbelt biogeographic region of south-western Western Australia.

== Conservation status ==
Gompholobium wonganense is classified as "Priority Three" by the Government of Western Australia Department of Biodiversity, Conservation and Attractions, meaning that it is poorly known and known from only a few locations but is not under imminent threat.
