= Gompholobium oreophilum =

Scientific classification
- Kingdom: Plantae
- Clade: Tracheophytes
- Clade: Angiosperms
- Clade: Eudicots
- Clade: Rosids
- Order: Fabales
- Family: Fabaceae
- Subfamily: Faboideae
- Genus: Gompholobium
- Species: G. oreophilum

Binomial name
- Gompholobium oreophilum C.F.Wilkins & Trudgen

Species of flowering plant

Gompholobium oreophilum is a species of flowering plant in the family Fabaceae and is endemic to the north-west of Western Australia. It is an erect shrub with pinnate leaves with elliptic leaflets, and racemes of yellow to orange and creamy-yellow, pea-like flowers.

== Description ==
Gompholobium oreophilum is an erect shrub that typically grows to 40–60 cm (16–24 in) high and up to 1 m (3 ft 3 in) wide with densely hairy branchlets. Its leaves are pinnate, mostly with nine or ten pairs of elliptic leaflets that are 4–8 mm (0.16–0.31 in) long and 2–5 mm (0.079–0.197 in) wide. The leaves are on a petiole 1.5–2.6 mm (0.059–0.102 in) long with stipules 1.5–3 mm (0.059–0.118 in) long at the base, and the leaflets are on petiolules 0.35–0.6 mm (0.014–0.024 in) long. The flowers are borne on racemes of thirteen to thirty, on a peduncle 2.0–6.6 mm (0.079–0.260 in) long, each flower on a pedicel 5–9 mm (0.20–0.35 in) long. There are bracts and bracteoles that fall as the flowers open. The sepals are fused at the base forming a tube 1.3–1.8 mm (0.051–0.071 in) long, the upper lobes 5.7–6.0 mm (0.22–0.24 in) long and the lower lobes slightly shorter. The standard petal is 10.2–12 mm (0.40–0.47 in) long and yellow to orange-yellow, the wings yellow to yellow-orange and 10.3–12.0 mm (0.41–0.47 in) long, and the keel creamy yellow and 10–12 mm (0.39–0.47 in) long. Flowering occurs from July to September and the fruit is an elliptic pod 6–7 mm (0.24–0.28 in) long and wide.

== Taxonomy ==
Gompholobium oreophilum was first formally described in 2012 by Carolyn F. Wilkins and Malcolm Eric Trudgen in the journal Nuytsia from specimens collected on Mount Sheila in the Hamersley Range in 2011. The specific epithet (oreophilum) means "mountain-loving", since the species occurs on or near mountains.

== Distribution and habitat ==
This pea grows in open woodland and grassland, mainly in the Hamersley Range but also sometimes in the Chichester Range, in the Pilbara and Gascoyne biogeographic regions of north-western Western Australia.

== Conservation status ==
Gompholobium oreophilum is classified as "not threatened" by the Western Australian Government Department of Parks and Wildlife.
