= Point Henry smelter =

Aluminum smelter in Moolap, Victoria, Australia

Coordinates: 38.13417°S 144.4254°E

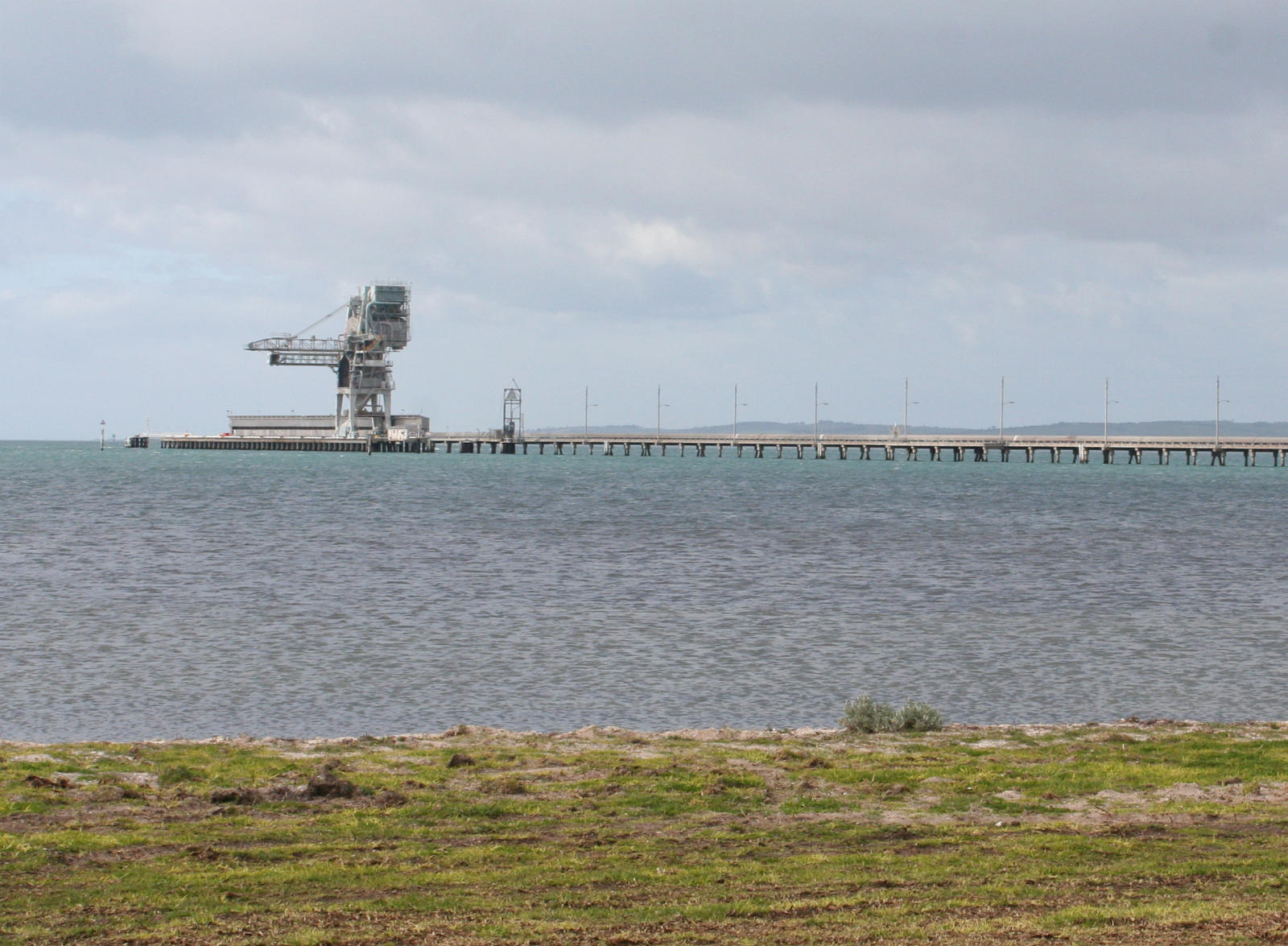
The wharf and unloader at Point Henry

The Point Henry aluminium smelter was located near Geelong, Victoria in the suburb of Moolap prior to its closure in 2014. The smelter had a production capacity of 185,000 tonnes of aluminium a year. It was operated by Alcoa World Alumina and Chemicals Australia, a joint venture between Alcoa (60%) and Alumina Limited (39.25%). Alumina was brought in by ship and unloaded at a dedicated pier, and approximately half of this finished aluminium was sold to the neighbouring Alcoa Australia Rolled Products plant, where aluminium was rolled into sheet for can manufacture. The remainder of the aluminium was despatched by road as ingots. Around 1000 people were employed at the Point Henry plant.

Construction of the smelter at Point Henry was started in 1960 by the Cavalier Construction Company. Smelting started in 1962, with full production commencing on 4 April 1963. The initial electricity supply to the smelter was a 220 kV transmission lines from the Geelong Terminal Station direct to the smelter. When production started, the maximum power demand of the smelter was 39.76 Megawatts (MW). By June 1964 it was 68.38 MW, and by October 76.6 MW – more than the entire Geelong region's demand. In November the following year it was 78.88 MW, February 1967 79.84 MW, and 140 MW by 1969. On 20 March 1969 Alcoa's own brown coal-fired Anglesea Power Station was brought online. With 150 MW capacity, the power station was connected to the smelter by around 30 kilometres of high-voltage transmission lines, and was used to augment the supply from the Victorian electrical grid.

The power demand of the smelter was 360 MW for a 185,000 tonne annual production capacity in 2014, of which approximately 40 per cent was met by the Anglesea power station. The Point Henry smelter, along with the smelter at Portland, used 18 to 25 per cent of Victoria's electricity production during the 2000s. In March 2010 it was announced that the operators of Loy Yang A power station (Loy Yang Power) had signed a contract with the smelter operators for the supply of electricity to power aluminium smelters at Portland and Point Henry until 2036, the existing power contracts expiring in 2014.

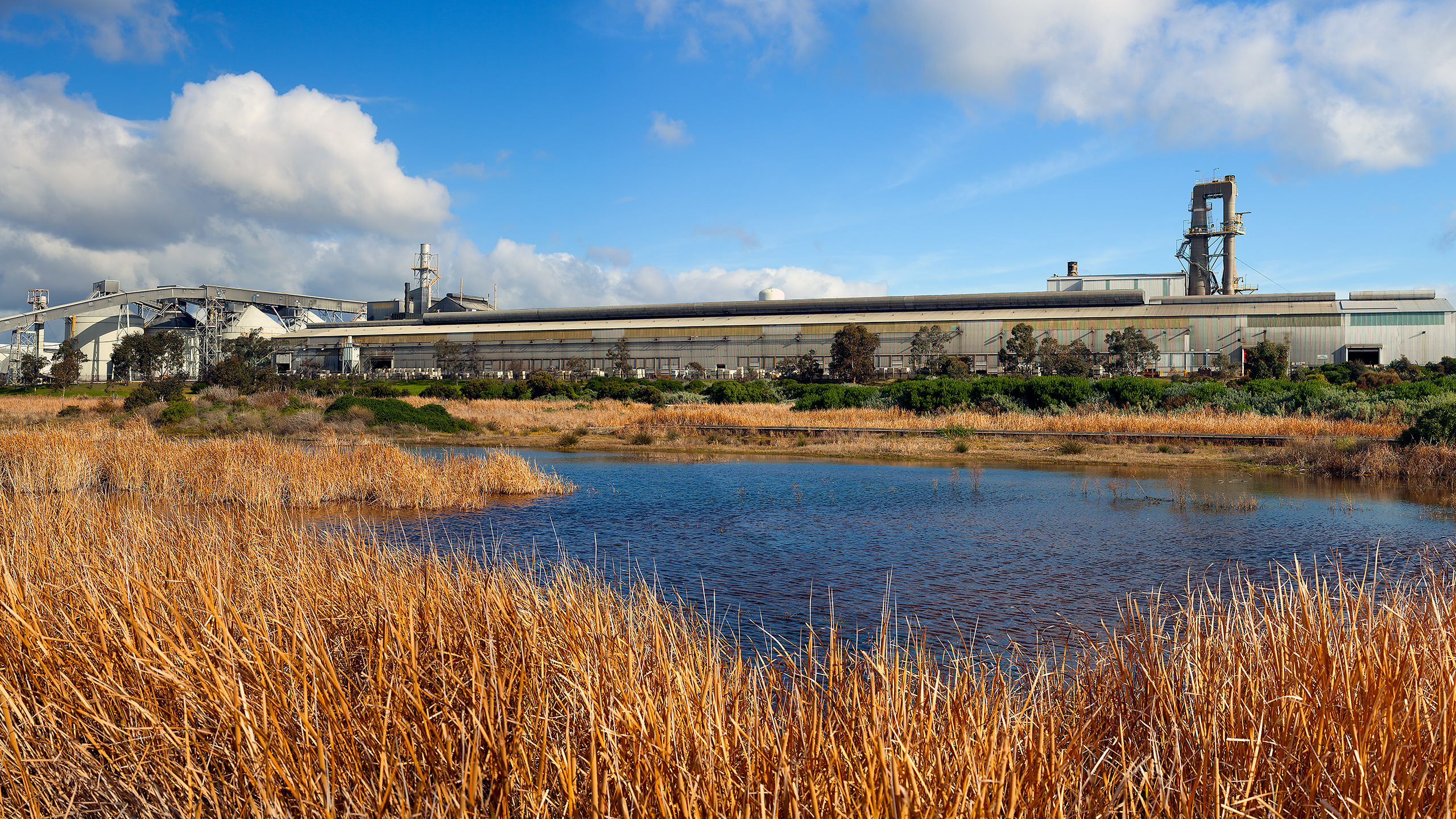
View of the smelter from the East

== Closure ==
In December 2013, the electricity hedge agreement between Loy Yang A and Point Henry was mutually terminated as a result of a court ordered mediation.

Following a board meeting in February 2014, Alcoa Chief Executive Klaus Kleinfeld announced that the smelter—along with two rolling mills—would close at the end of 2014. Kleinfeld explained, "These assets are no longer competitive and are not financially sustainable today or into the future." The company stated that its Portland smelter, also in the Australian state of Victoria, will remain operational, while a coal mine and power station that power the Point Henry facility will be put up for sale. Power to the potline was turned off on Thursday 31 July 2014. The rolling mill ceased operation on 19 December 2014.

Alcoa has started decommissioning the site, a process that is expected to take three to five years. The company has prepared a community masterplan for the site following remediation.

== See also ==
- Aluminium smelting
- Anglesea Power Station
- List of aluminium smelters
