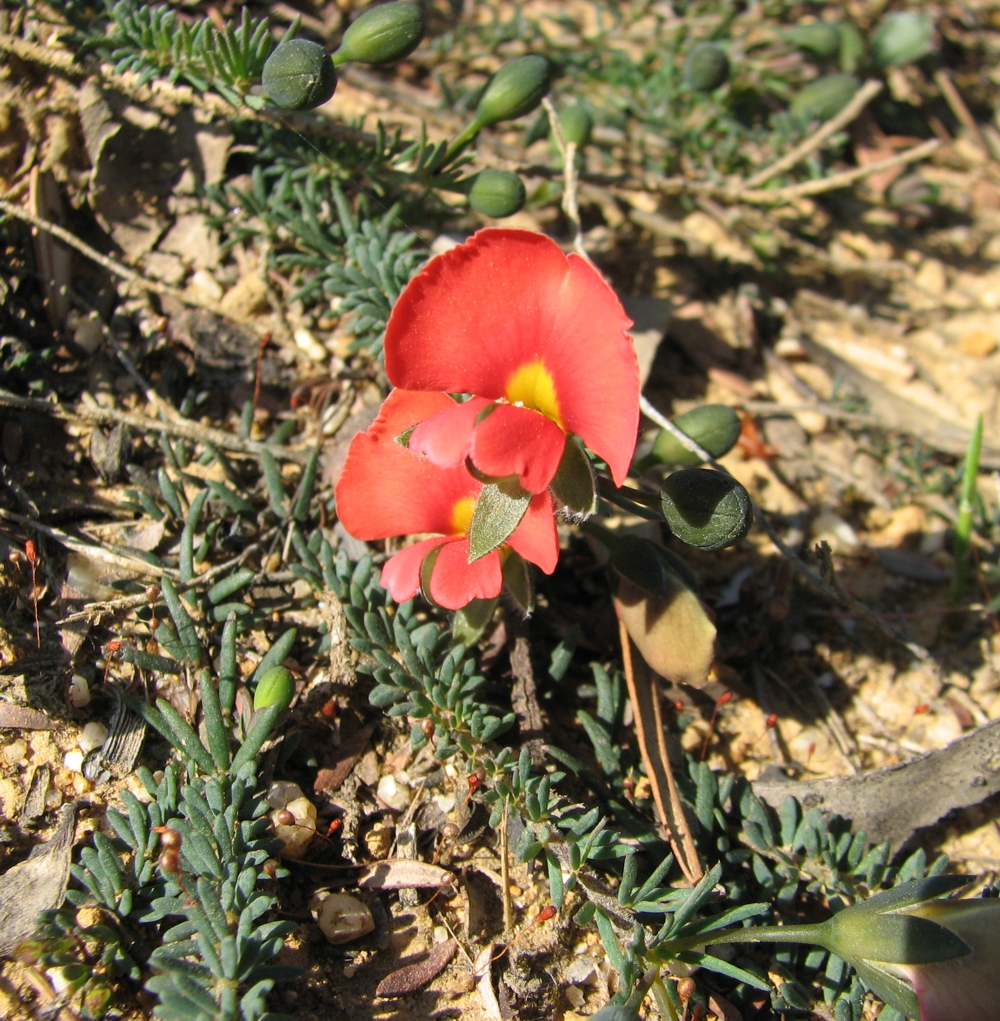
- Gompholobium ecostatum at Anglesea Heath in Victoria

Scientific classification
- Kingdom: Plantae
- Clade: Tracheophytes
- Clade: Angiosperms
- Clade: Eudicots
- Clade: Rosids
- Order: Fabales
- Family: Fabaceae
- Subfamily: Faboideae
- Genus: Gompholobium
- Species: G. ecostatum

Binomial name
- Gompholobium ecostatum Kuchel

Synonyms
- Gompholobium minus var. grandiflora Benth.

= Gompholobium ecostatum =

Dwarf wedge-pea

Species of plant

Gompholobium ecostatum, commonly known as dwarf wedge-pea, is a species of flowering plant in the family Fabaceae and is endemic to southern Australia. It is a low-lying to erect shrub with trifoliate leaves with linear to lance-shaped leaflets, and apricot-coloured to reddish, sometimes yellow flowers.

== Description ==
Gompholobium ecostatum is a low-lying to erect shrub that typically grows up to a height of up to 50 cm (20 in) high and has hairy, wiry stems. The leaves are trifoliate, the leaflets linear to narrow lance-shaped, 3–15 mm (0.12–0.59 in) long and about 1 mm (0.039 in) wide and sessile with the edges rolled under. There are tapering stipules about 1 mm (0.039 in) long at the base of the leaves. The flowers are arranged singly or in pairs in leaf axils, each flower 15–20 mm (0.59–0.79 in) long on a pedicel up to 10 mm (0.39 in) long. The sepals are up to 8 mm (0.31 in) long and glabrous on the outside and the petals are apricot to reddish, sometimes yellow. Flowering occurs from October to March and the fruit is an obliquely oval pod 10–12 mm (0.39–0.47 in) long.

== Taxonomy ==
Gompholobium ecostatum was first formally described in 1965 by Rex Harold Kuchel in the Supplement to J.M.Black's Flora of South Australia (Second Edition, 1943-1957). The specific epithet (ecostatum) means "without ribs".

== Distribution and habitat ==
Dwarf wedge-pea grows in heathland and woodland in southern Victoria from near Wilsons Promontory to Kangaroo Island in South Australia and inland as far as the Little Desert National Park. It also occurs on Flinders Island in Tasmania.

== Conservation status ==
This pea is classified as "endangered" under the Tasmanian Government Threatened Species Protection Act 1995.
