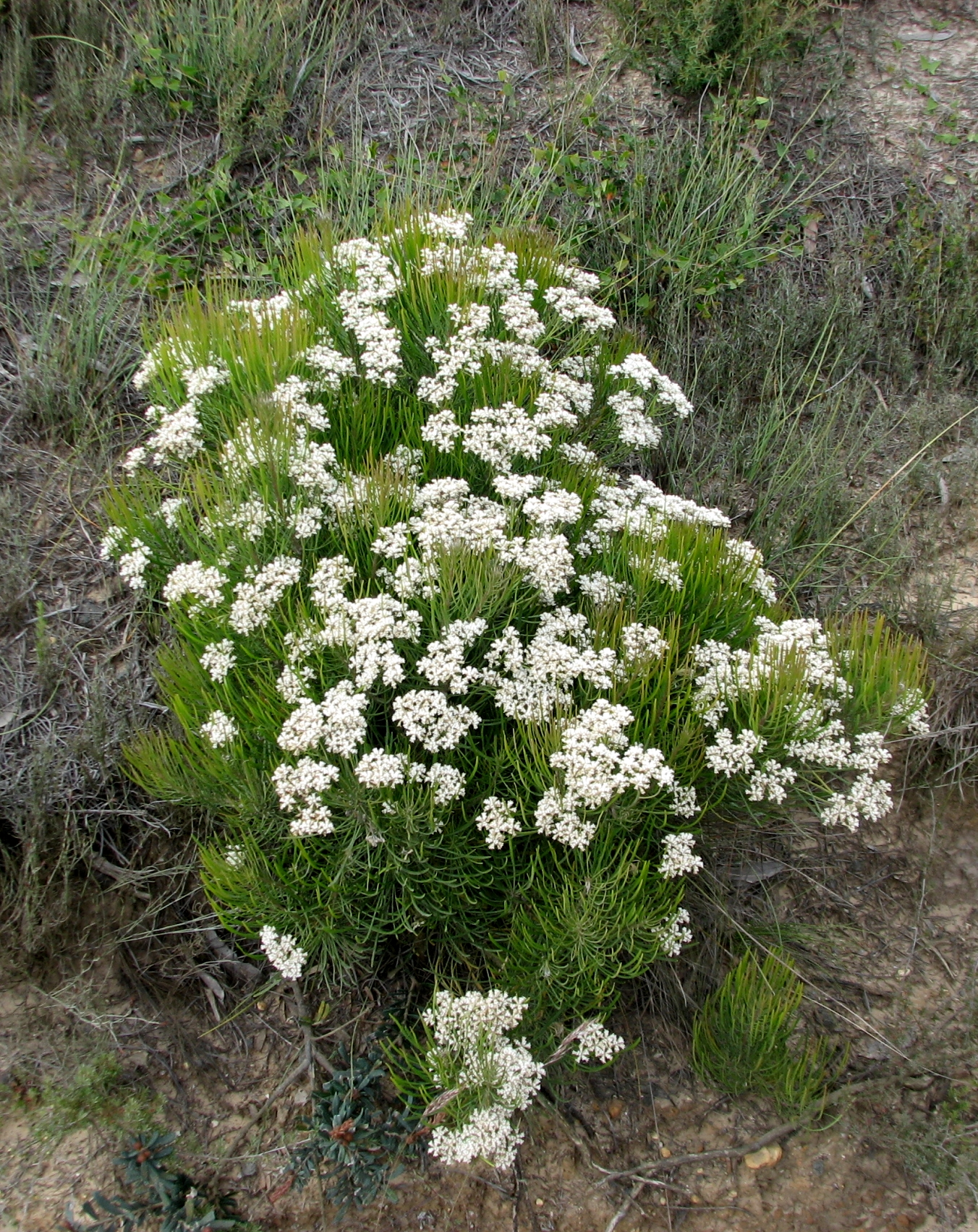
- Conospermum mitchellii at Anglesea Heath

Scientific classification
- Kingdom: Plantae
- Clade: Tracheophytes
- Clade: Angiosperms
- Clade: Eudicots
- Order: Proteales
- Family: Proteaceae
- Genus: Conospermum
- Species: C. mitchellii

Binomial name
- Conospermum mitchellii Meisn.

Synonyms
- Conospermum elongatum E.M.Benn.; Conospermum mitchellii var. ? dallachii Meisn.; Conospermum mitchellii Meisn. var. mitchellii; Conospermum sp. (Grampians)

= Conospermum mitchellii =

Victorian smokebush

Species of Australian shrub

Conospermum mitchellii, commonly known as Victorian smokebush, is a species of flowering plant of the family Proteaceae and is endemic to the western half of Victoria. It is an erect shrub with crowded, linear leaves, panicles of white, blue or lilac flowers and orange or reddish brown nuts.

== Description ==
Conospermum mitchellii is a multistemmed shrub that typically grows to a height of up to 1–2 m (3 ft 3 in – 6 ft 7 in) and has its branches covered with silky hairs. The leaves are crowded, linear, 50–120 mm (2.0–4.7 in) long, 1–4 mm (0.039–0.157 in) wide and erect. The flowers are arranged in panicles that are longer than the leaves, on a peduncle 45–185 mm (1.8–7.3 in) long with egg-shaped to lance-shaped bracteoles 2.5–4.5 mm (0.098–0.177 in) long and 1.0–2.8 mm (0.039–0.110 in) wide. The perianth is white, blue or lilac, forming a tube 2–4 mm (0.079–0.157 in) long. The upper lip is egg-shaped, 2.5–4 mm (0.098–0.157 in) long and 1.8–3.0 mm (0.071–0.118 in) wide, the lower lip joined for 1.5–2.5 mm (0.059–0.098 in) with narrowly oblong to oblong lobes 1.5–2.3 mm (0.059–0.091 in) long and 0.5–1 mm (0.020–0.039 in) wide. Flowering occurs from July to December, and the fruit is a hairy nut about 2 mm (0.079 in) long, 2.1 mm (0.083 in) wide, with a reddish brown base.

== Taxonomy ==
Conospermum mitchellii was first formally described in 1856 by Carl Meissner in de Candolle's, Prodromus Systematis Naturalis Regni Vegetabilis, from a specimen collected during Thomas Mitchell's 1836 expedition.

== Distribution and habitat ==
Victorian smokebush grows in heath and heathy woodland on sandy soils in the Grampians National Park, Lower Glenelg National Park and near Anglesea, mostly in western Victoria.
