= AWAC =

AWAC may refer to:

- Airborne early warning and control, an airborne radar system designed to detect aircraft
- Air Wisconsin Airlines Corporation, a regional airline in the United States of America
- Alcoa World Alumina and Chemicals, a mining company
