= John Marlay (businessman) =

John Marlay is chairman of ASX200 professional infrastructure and environmental services company, Cardno Limited (ASX:CDD). Prior to his appointment as chairman of Cardno in August 2012, Marlay has served as a director on the Cardno Board since November 2011.

Marlay is also chairman of Tomago Aluminium a joint venture between Rio Tinto, Alcan, CSR/AMP and Hydro Aluminum companies. He is a non-executive director of Incitec Pivot, Boral and Alesco Corporation. Marlay is a former director of Alcoa Australia Limited, Alcoa World Alumina LLC and the Business Council of Australia.

Marlay is a member of the Climate Change Authority, an Australian Federal Government Statutory Board. This Authority is referred to as the "Reserve Bank for Climate Change".

Prior to taking on senior non-executive director roles, Marlay held a range of senior management positions. From 2002 to 2008, Marlay held the position of chief executive officer and managing director of Alumina Limited (AWC), a leading Australian company listed on the ASX and the NYSE which holds a 40% interest in Alcoa World Alumina and Chemicals Company. From 1995 to 2001, Marlay held various senior management roles with Pioneer in Australia and the United Kingdom and subsequently with Hanson PLC, a UK-headquartered international industrial company, which acquired the worldwide operations of Pioneer International Limited in early 2000. Prior to joining Pioneer International, Marlay also held senior positions with James Hardie and Esso Australia Limited.

Marlay holds a Bachelor of Science degree from the University of Queensland and a graduate diploma from the Australian Institute of Company Directors. He is a fellow of The Australian Institute of Company Directors.
