= John Marlay =

John Marlay may refer to:

- John Marlay (businessman), Australian businessman
- John Marlay (MP), English merchant, military commander and politician

== See also ==
- John Marley, American actor
- John Marley (mining engineer), English mining engineer
