= List of acts of the Parliament of Victoria from 1993 =

This is a list of acts of the Parliament of Victoria, Australia for the year 1993.

== 1993 ==
Short title, or popular name	Citation	Royal assent
Long title
Mutual Recognition (Victoria) Act 1993	No. 2 of 1993	20 April 1993
An Act to adopt the Mutual Recognition Act 1992 (Note: Mutual Recognition Act 1992 (No. 198 (Cth))) of the Commonwealth and for other purposes.
Barley Marketing Act 1993	No. 7 of 1993	4 May 1993
An Act relating to the marketing of barley and for other purposes.
City of Greater Geelong Act 1993	No. 16 of 1993	18 May 1993
An Act to constitute the Greater Geelong City Council, to abolish the Geelong Regional Commission, to repeal the Geelong Regional Commission Act 1977 (Note: Geelong Regional Commission Act 1977 (No. 9024)) and for other purposes.
Tertiary Education Act 1993	No. 18 of 1993	18 May 1993
An Act to provide for the better promotion, development and co-ordination of post-secondary education in Victoria, to abolish the Post-Secondary Education Commission, to repeal the Post-Secondary Education Act 1978, (Note: Post-Secondary Education Act 1978 (No. 9145)) to amend the Vocational Education and Training Act 1990 (Note: Vocational Education and Training Act 1990 (No. 45 of 1990)) and certain other Acts and for other purposes.
Marine (Amendment) Act 1993 (repealed)	No. 20 of 1993	
(Repealed by Statute Law Revision (Repeals) Act 1999 (No. 3 of 1999))
Docklands Authority (Amendment) Act 1993 (repealed)	No. 24 of 1993	
(Repealed by Statute Law (Further Revision) Act 2006 (No. 29 of 2006))
Ethnic Affairs Commission Act 1993 or the Victorian Multicultural Commission Act 1993 (repealed)	No. 26 of 1993	25 May 1993
An Act to create a new Ethnic Affairs Commission, to repeal the Ethnic Affairs Commission Act 1982 (Note: Ethnic Affairs Commission Act 1982 (No. 9789)) and for other purposes. (Repealed by Multicultural Victoria Act 2004 (No. 100 of 2004))
Forests (S.E.A.S. Sapfor Ltd Agreement) Act 1993	No. 32 of 1993	25 May 1993
An Act to ratify an agreement with S.E.A.S. Sapfor Ltd and for other purposes.
State Deficit Levy (Amendment) Act 1993 (repealed)	No. 36 of 1993	25 May 1993
An Act to amend the State Deficit Levy Act 1992 (Note: State Deficit Levy Act 1992 (No. 75 of 1992)) and for other purposes. (Repealed by Statute Law Revision (Repeals) Act 1999 (No. 3 of 1999))
Murray-Darling Basin Act 1993	No. 39 of 1993	1 June 1993
An Act to approve and provide for carrying out an agreement entered into between the Commonwealth, New South Wales, Victoria and South Australia with regard to the water, land and other environmental resources of the Murray-Darling Basin, and for other purposes.
Meat Industry Act 1993	No. 40 of 1993	1 June 1993
An Act to provide for a system of inspection and licensing in the meat industry, to establish standards for facilities and processes used in that industry, to enable the regulation of meat transport vehicles, to establish the Victorian Meat Authority, to repeal the Abattoir and Meat Inspection Act 1973, (Note: Abattoir and Meat Inspection Act 1973 (No. 8404)) the Poultry Processing Act 1968 (Note: Poultry Processing Act 1968 (No. 7768)) and the Abattoir and Meat Inspection (Arrangements) Act 1987 (Note: Abattoir and Meat Inspection (Arrangements) Act 1987 (No. 82 of 1987)) to repeal or amend various other Acts and for other purposes.
Casino Control (Amendment) Act 1993 (repealed)	No. 43 of 1993	25 May 1993
An Act to amend the Casino Control Act 1991 (Note: Casino Control Act 1991 (No. 47 of 1991)) and the Gaming Machine Control Act 1991 (Note: Gaming Machine Control Act 1991 (No. 53 of 1991)) and for other purposes. (Repealed by Statute Law Revision (Repeals) Act 1999 (No. 3 of 1999))
Institute of Educational Administration (Repeal) Act 1993	No. 45 of 1993	1 June 1993
An Act to repeal the Institute of Educational Administration Act 1980, (Note: Institute of Educational Administration Act 1980 (No. 9465)) to make provisions concerning the assets, liabilities and staff of the Institute and for other purposes.
Accident Compensation (WorkCover Insurance) Act 1993	No. 50 of 1993	1 June 1993
An Act to require compulsory WorkCover insurance for employers and to establish a WorkCover insurance system, to generally amend the Accident Compensation Act 1985 (Note: Accident Compensation Act 1985 (No. 10191)) and the Workers Compensation Act 1958 (Note: Workers Compensation Act 1958 (No. 6419)) and to make minor amendments to the Stamps Act 1958 (Note: Stamps Act 1958 (No. 6375)) and the Accident Compensation (WorkCover) Act 1992 (Note: Accident Compensation (WorkCover) Act 1992 (No. 67 of 1992)) and for other purposes.
Supply (1993-94, No. 1) Act 1993 (repealed)	No. 51 of 1993	8 June 1993
An Act to make interim provision for the appropriation of moneys out of the Consolidated Fund for recurrent services and for certain works and purposes for the financial year 1993-94. (Repealed by Statute Law Revision (Repeals) Act 1999 (No. 3 of 1999))
Supply (Parliament 1993-94, No. 1) Act 1993 (repealed)	No. 52 of 1993	8 June 1993
An Act to make interim provision for the appropriation of moneys out of the Consolidated Fund for recurrent services and for certain works and purposes for the Parliament for the financial year 1993-94. (Repealed by Statute Law Revision (Repeals) Act 1999 (No. 3 of 1999))
Superannuation (Compliance) Act 1993	No. 54 of 1993	8 June 1993
An Act to amend certain Acts relating to superannuation for the purposes of the superannuation guarantee scheme of the Commonwealth, to amend the Superannuation (Portability) Act 1989 (Note: Superannuation (Portability) Act 1989 (No. 14 of 1989)) and for other purposes.
Victoria Racing Club (Amendment) Act 1993	No. 55 of 1993	8 June 1993
An Act to amend The Victoria Racing Club Act 1871 (Note: Victoria Racing Club Act 1871 (35 Vict. No. 398)) and for other purposes.
Club Keno Act 1993	No. 56 of 1993	8 June 1993
An Act to make provisions for the game of Club Keno, to amend the Tattersall Consultations Act 1958 (Note: Tattersall Consultations Act 1958 (No. 6390)) and the Racing Act 1958 (Note: Racing Act 1958 (No. 6353)) and for other purposes.
Tattersall Consultations (Reporting) Act 1993 (repealed)	No. 59 of 1993	8 June 1993
An Act to amend the Tattersall Consultations Act 1958 and for other purposes. (Repealed by Statute Law Revision (Repeals) Act 1999 (No. 3 of 1999))
Crimes (Criminal Trials) Act 1993	No. 60 of 1993	8 June 1993
An Act to provide for the efficient conduct of criminal trials, to amend the Crimes Act 1958, (Note: Crimes Act 1958 (No. 6231)) the Evidence Act 1958, (Note: Evidence Act 1958 (No. 6246)) the Judicial Proceedings Reports Act 1958 (Note: Judicial Proceedings Reports Act 1958 (No. 6280)) and the Sentencing Act 1991 (Note: Sentencing Act 1991 (No. 49 of 1991)) and for other purposes.
Victorian Plantations Corporation Act 1993	No. 61 of 1993	8 June 1993
An Act to confer additional functions and powers on the Victorian Plantations Corporation, a State body established under the State Owned Enterprises Act 1992, (Note: State Owned Enterprises Act 1992 (No. 90 of 1992)) to make further provision for the management of plantations, to make consequential amendments to certain Acts and for other purposes.
Appropriation (1992-93) Act 1993 (repealed)	No. 62 of 1993	8 June 1993
An Act to appropriate certain sums out of the Consolidated Fund to programs for recurrent services and for certain works and purposes for the financial year 1992-93 and to appropriate the supplies granted for recurrent services and for certain works and purposes under the Appropriation (Interim Provision 1992-93) Act 1992 (Note: Appropriation (Interim Provision 1992-93) Act 1992 (No. 58 of 1992)) and for other purposes. (Repealed by Statute Law Revision (Repeals) Act 1999 (No. 3 of 1999))
Appropriation (Parliament 1992-93) Act 1993 (repealed)	No. 63 of 1993	8 June 1993
An Act to appropriate certain sums out of the Consolidated Fund by programs for recurrent services and for certain works and purposes for the financial year 1992-93 and to appropriate the supplies granted for recurrent services and for certain works and purposes under the Appropriation (Interim Provision, Parliament 1992-93) Act 1992 (Note: Appropriation (Interim Provision, Parliament 1992-93) Act 1992 (No. 57 of 1992)) and for other purposes. (Repealed by Statute Law Revision (Repeals) Act 1999 (No. 3 of 1999))
Loy Yang B (Amendment) Act 1993 (repealed)	No. 66 of 1993	21 September 1993
An Act to amend the Loy Yang B Act 1992 (Note: Loy Yang B Act 1992 (No. 35 of 1992)) and for other purposes. (Repealed by Statute Law Revision (Repeals) Act 1999 (No. 3 of 1999))
La Trobe University (Amendment) Act 1993	No. 68 of 1993	5 October 1993
An Act to amend the La Trobe University Act 1964 (Note: La Trobe University Act 1964 (No. 7189)) to provide for changes to La Trobe University's academic structure and for the merger of the La Trobe University College of Northern Victoria with the University and for other purposes.
Summary Offences (Stolen Cattle) Act 1993 (repealed)	No. 71 of 1993	5 October 1993
An Act to amend the Summary Offences Act 1966 (Note: Summary Offences Act 1966 (No. 7405)) and the Magistrates' Court Act 1989 (Note: Magistrates' Court Act 1989 (No. 51 of 1989)) and for other purposes. (Repealed by Statute Law Revision (Repeals) Act 1999 (No. 3 of 1999))
Tattersall Consultations (Further Amendment) Act 1993	No. 73 of 1993	26 October 1993
An Act to amend the Tattersall Consultations Act 1958 and for other purposes.
Appropriation (1993-94, No. 1) Act 1993 (repealed)	No. 75 of 1993	26 October 1993
An Act to appropriate certain sums out of the Consolidated Fund for the purpose of recurrent and works and services expenditure for the financial year 1993-94 and to appropriate the supplies granted under the Supply (1993-94, No. 1) Act 1993 (Note: Supply (1993-94, No. 1) Act 1993 (No. 51 of 1993)) and for other purposes. (Repealed by Statute Law Revision (Repeals) Act 1999 (No. 3 of 1999))
Appropriation (Parliament 1993-94, No. 1) Act 1993 (repealed)	No. 76 of 1993	26 October 1993
An Act to appropriate certain sums out of the Consolidated Fund for the purpose of recurrent and works and services expenditure in relation to the Parliament for the financial year 1993-94 and to appropriate the supplies granted under the Supply (Parliament 1993-94, No. 1) Act 1993 (Note: Supply (Parliament 1993-94, No. 1) Act 1993 (No. 52 of 1993)) and for other purposes. (Repealed by Statute Law Revision (Repeals) Act 1999 (No. 3 of 1999))
Sunday Entertainment (Repeal) Act 1993	No. 80 of 1993	3 November 1993
An Act to repeal the Sunday Entertainment Act 1967 (Note: Sunday Entertainment Act 1967 (No. 7634)) and for other purposes.
Gas and Fuel Corporation (Heatane Gas) Act 1993	No. 88 of 1993	16 November 1993
An Act to facilitate the transfer of certain pipelines in connection with the transfer and operation of the Heatane gas business of the Gas and Fuel Corporation of Victoria, to amend the Gas and Fuel Corporation Act 1958 (Note: Gas and Fuel Corporation Act 1958 (No. 6260)) and for other purposes.
State Owned Enterprises (Amendment) Act 1993	No. 92 of 1993	16 November 1993
An Act to amend the State Owned Enterprises Act 1992 (Note: State Owned Enterprises Act 1992 (No. 90 of 1992)) and for other purposes. (Repealed by Statute Law Revision (Repeals) Act 1999 (No. 3 of 1999))
Casino Control (Further Amendment) Act 1993 (repealed)	No. 93 of 1993	16 November 1993
An Act to amend the Casino Control Act 1991 and the Gaming Machine Control Act 1991 and for other purposes. (Repealed by Statute Law Revision (Repeals) Act 1999 (No. 3 of 1999))
Casino (Management Agreement) Act 1993	No. 94 of 1993	16 November 1993
An Act to ratify the management agreement for the Melbourne Casino, to amend the Casino Control Act 1991 and the Gaming Machine Control Act 1991 and for other purposes.
Teaching Service (Amendment) Act 1993 (repealed)	No. 96 of 1993	16 November 1993
An Act to amend the Teaching Service Act 1981 (Note: Education Service Act 1981 (No. 9714)) to create a Principal Class within the teaching service, to remove the requirements for employment registers and to revise procedures for inquiring into the conduct of members of the teaching service, and for other purposes. (Repealed by Legislation Reform (Repeals No. 2) Act 2008 (No. 16 of 2008))
City of Melbourne Act 1993	No. 98 of 1993	18 November 1993
An Act to re-constitute the City of Melbourne, to amend the Local Government Act 1989, (Note: Local Government Act 1989 (No. 11 of 1989)) to alter the boundaries of specified Councils and for other purposes.
University of Ballarat Act 1993	No. 107 of 1993	26 November 1993
An Act to establish a university to be known as the University of Ballarat, to amend the Tertiary Education Act 1993 (Note: Tertiary Education Act 1993 (No. 18 of 1993)) and the Administrative Law Act 1978 (Note: Administrative Law Act 1978 (No. 9234)) and for other purposes.
TT-Line Gaming Act 1993	No. 109 of 1993	26 November 1993
An Act to allow gaming on certain ships and for other purposes.
Public Sector Superannuation (Administration) Act 1993	No. 110 of 1993	30 November 1993
An Act to establish the Victorian Superannuation Board, to constitute the Victorian Superannuation Fund, to amend the Borrowing and Investment Powers Act 1987, (Note: Borrowing and Investment Powers Act 1987 (No. 13 of 1987)) the State Superannuation Act 1988, (Note: State Superannuation Act 1988 (No. 50 of 1988)) the State Casual Employees Superannuation Act 1989, (Note: State Casual Employees Superannuation Act 1989 (?)) the Parliamentary Salaries and Superannuation Act 1968, (Note: Parliamentary Salaries and Superannuation Act 1968 (No. 7723)) the Hospitals Superannuation Act 1988, (Note: Hospitals Superannuation Act 1988 (No. 21 of 1988)) the Local Authorities Superannuation Act 1988, (Note: Local Authorities Superannuation Act 1988 (No. 23 of 1988)) the Transport Superannuation Act 1988, (Note: Transport Superannuation Act 1988 (No. 33 of 1988)) the Emergency Services Superannuation Act 1986, (Note: Emergency Services Superannuation Act 1986 (No. 94 of 1986)) the Superannuation (Portability) Act 1989, (Note: Superannuation (Portability) Act 1989 (No. 14 of 1989)) the State Employees Retirement Benefits Act 1979 (Note: State Employees Retirement Benefits Act 1979 (No. 9363)) and for other purposes.
Nurses Act 1993	No. 111 of 1993	7 December 1993
An Act to make provision for the registration of nurses, investigation into the professional conduct and fitness to practise of registered nurses, to establish the Nurses Board of Victoria and the Nurses Board Fund of Victoria, to repeal the Nurses Act 1958 (Note: Nurses Act 1958 (No. 6328)) and for other purposes.
Stock (Seller Liability and Declarations) Act 1993	No. 113 of 1993	7 December 1993
An Act to impose certain minimum conditions on the sale of stock and to establish a system of seller declarations as to the state of stock to be sold and for other purposes.
Rural Finance (VEDC Abolition) Act 1993 (repealed)	No. 115 of 1993	7 December 1993
An Act to amend the Rural Finance Act 1988 (Note: Rural Finance Act 1988 (No. 44 of 1988)) and to repeal the Victorian Economic Development Corporation Act 1981 (Note: Victorian Economic Development Corporation Act 1981 (No. 9574)) and to make consequential amendments to certain Acts and for other purposes. (Repealed by Treasury Legislation (Repeal) Act 2005 (No. 73 of 2005))
Telecommunications (Interception) (State Provisions) (Amendment) Act 1993 (repealed)	No. 116 of 1993	7 December 1993
An Act to amend the Telecommunications (Interception) (State Provisions) Act 1988 (Note: Telecommunications (Interception) (State Provisions) Act 1988 (No. 46 of 1988)) and for other purposes. (Repealed by Statute Law Revision (Repeals) Act 1999 (No. 3 of 1999))
Public Holidays Act 1993	No. 119 of 1993	7 December 1993
An Act to make new provision with respect to public holidays in Victoria, to repeal the Bank Holidays Act 1958, (Note: Bank Holidays Act 1958 (No. 6205)) to amend the Public Sector Management Act 1992, (Note: Public Sector Management Act 1992 (No. 68 of 1992)) the Teaching Service Act 1981 and the Shop Trading Act 1987, (Note: Shop Trading Act 1987 (No. 10 of 1987)) to make consequential amendments to certain other Acts and for other purposes.
Building Act 1993	No. 126 of 1993	14 December 1993
An Act to provide for the regulation of building and building standards, to amend various Acts and for other purposes.
Electricity Industry Act 1993 or the Electricity Industry (Residual Provisions) Act 1993	No. 130 of 1993	14 December 1993
An Act relating to the restructuring of the electricity supply industry, to amend the State Electricity Commission Act 1958, (Note: State Electricity Commission Act 1958 (No. 6377)) to make consequential amendments to other Acts and for other purposes.
Adult, Community and Further Education (Employment) Act 1993	No. X of 1993	
Annual Leave Payments (Amendment) Act 1993 (repealed)	No. 64 of 1993	
(Repealed by Statute Law Revision (Repeals) Act 1999 (No. 3 of 1999))
Association for the Blind (Braille and Talking Book Library) Act 1993	No. X of 1993	
Audit (Tender Board) Act 1993	No. X of 1993	
Board of Studies Act 1993	No. X of 1993	
Borrowing and Investment Powers (Amendment) Act 1993 (repealed)	No. 99 of 1993	
(Repealed by Legislation Reform (Repeals No. 3) Act 2008 (No. 53 of 2008))
Business Franchise (Petroleum Products) (Amendment) Act 1993 (repealed)	No. 46 of 1993	
(Repealed by Statute Law Revision (Repeals) Act 1999 (No. 3 of 1999))
Caravan Parks and Movable Dwellings (Amendment) Act 1993	No. X of 1993	
Cattle and Swine Compensation (Amendment) Act 1993 (repealed)	No. 91 of 1993	
(Repealed by Statute Law Revision (Repeals) Act 1999 (No. 3 of 1999))
Chattel Securities (Amendment) Act 1993	No. 106 of 1993	
(Repealed by Statute Law Revision (Repeals) Act 1999 (No. 3 of 1999))
Children and Young Persons (Further Amendment) Act 1993 (repealed)	No. 10 of 1993	
(Repealed by Statute Law Revision (Repeals) Act 1999 (No. 3 of 1999))
Choice of Law (Limitation Periods) Act 1993	No. X of 1993	
Classification of Films and Publications (Amendment) Act 1993 (repealed)	No. 105 of 1993	
(Repealed by Statute Law Revision (Repeals) Act 1999 (No. 3 of 1999))
Commercial Arbitration (Amendment) Act 1993	No. X of 1993	
Corrections (Management) Act 1993	No. X of 1993	
Credit (Administration) (Amendment) Act 1993 (repealed)	No. 72 of 1993	
(Repealed by Statute Law Revision Act 2013 (No. 70 of 2013)
Crimes (Amendment) Act 1993	No. X of 1993	
Crimes (HIV) Act 1993 (repealed)	No. 19 of 1993	
(Repealed by Statute Law Revision (Repeals) Act 1999 (No. 3 of 1999))
Crown Land Acts (Amendment) Act 1993	No. X of 1993	
Debits Tax (Amendment) Act 1993 (repealed)	No. 6 of 1993	
(Repealed by Statute Law Revision (Repeals) Act 1999 (No. 3 of 1999))
Education (Amendment) Act 1993 (repealed)	No. 121 of 1993	
(Repealed by Statute Law Revision (Repeals) Act 1999 (No. 3 of 1999))
Education Acts (Teachers) Act 1993 (repealed)	No. 44 of 1993	
(Repealed by Legislation Reform (Repeals No. 2) Act 2008 (No. 16 of 2008))
Egg Industry (Deregulation) Act 1993	No. X of 1993	
Emergency Services Superannuation (Special Payments) Act 1993 (repealed)	No. 53 of 1993	
(Repealed by Statute Law Revision (Repeals) Act 1999 (No. 3 of 1999))
Employee Relations (Amendment) Act 1993 (repealed)	No. 114 of 1993	
(Repealed by Statute Law Revision (Repeals) Act 1999 (No. 3 of 1999))
Equal Opportunity (Amendment) Act 1993	No. X of 1993	
Estate Agents (Amendment) Act 1993 (repealed)	No. 38 of 1993	
(Repealed by Statute Law Revision (Repeals) Act 1999 (No. 3 of 1999))
Evidence (Proof of Offences) Act 1993 (repealed)	No. 74 of 1993	
(Repealed by Statute Law Revision (Repeals) Act 1999 (No. 3 of 1999))
Evidence (Unsworn Evidence) Act 1993	No. X of 1993	
Financial Institutions Duty (Amendment) Act 1993 (repealed)	No. 8 of 1993	
(Repealed by Statute Law Revision (Repeals) Act 1999 (No. 3 of 1999))
Freedom of Information (Amendment) Act 1993	No. X of 1993	
Funerals (Pre-Paid Money) Act 1993	No. X of 1993	
Gaming Machine Control (Amendment) Act 1993	No. X of 1993	
Gaming Machine Control (General Amendment) Act 1993	No. X of 1993	
Health (Amendment) Act 1993 (repealed)	No. 84 of 1993	
(Repealed by Statute Law Revision (Repeals) Act 1999 (No. 3 of 1999))
Health and Community Services (Further Amendment) Act 1993 (repealed)	No. 124 of 1993	
(Repealed by Legislation Reform (Repeals No. 1) Act 2008 (No. 10 of 2008))
Health and Community Services (General Amendment) Act 1993	No. X of 1993	
Health Services (Amendment) Act 1993 (repealed)	No. 112 of 1993	
(Repealed by Statute Law Revision (Repeals) Act 1999 (No. 3 of 1999))
Historic Shipwrecks (Amendment) Act 1993	No. X of 1993	
Interpretation of Legislation (Amendment) Act 1993 (repealed)	No. 95 of 1993	
(Repealed by Statute Law Revision (Repeals) Act 1999 (No. 3 of 1999))
Juries (Amendment) Act 1993 (repealed)	No. 108 of 1993	
(Repealed by Statute Law Revision (Repeals) Act 1999 (No. 3 of 1999))
Land (Amendment) Act 1993	No. X of 1993	
Land (Crown Grants and Reserves) Act 1993 (repealed)	No. 5 of 1993	
(Repealed by Legislation Reform (Repeals No. 2) Act 2008 (No. 16 of 2008))
Land (Further Amendment) Act 1993 (repealed)	No. 79 of 1993	
(Repealed by Statute Law Revision (Repeals) Act 1999 (No. 3 of 1999))
Land (Miscellaneous Matters) Act 1993	No. X of 1993	
Land Tax (Amendment) Act 1993	No. X of 1993	
Land Tax (Further Amendment) Act 1993	No. X of 1993	
Land Titles Validation Act 1993	No. X of 1993	
Legal Profession Practice (Guarantee Fund) Act 1993	No. X of 1993	
Limitation of Actions (Amendment) Act 1993	No. X of 1993	
Liquor Control (Amendment) Act 1993	No. X of 1993	
Local Government (General Amendment) Act 1993 (repealed)	No. 43 of 1993	
(Repealed by Statute Law Revision (Repeals) Act 1999 (No. 3 of 1999))
Local Government (Miscellaneous Amendments) Act 1993	No. X of 1993	
Melbourne Wholesale Fruit and Vegetable Market Trust (Amendment) Act 1993	No. X of 1993	
Mineral Resources Development (Amendment) Act 1993	No. X of 1993	
Occupational Health and Safety (Miscellaneous Amendments) Act 1993 (repealed)	No. 78 of 1993	
(Repealed by Statute Law Revision (Repeals) Act 1999 (No. 3 of 1999))
Parliamentary Salaries and Superannuation (Basic Salary) Act 1993 (repealed)	No. 3 of 1993	
(Repealed by Statute Law Revision (Repeals) Act 1999 (No. 3 of 1999))
Pay-roll Tax (Amendment) Act 1993 (repealed)	No. 9 of 1993	
(Repealed by Statute Law Revision (Repeals) Act 1999 (No. 3 of 1999))
Petroleum (Submerged Lands) (Amendment) Act 1993 (repealed)	No. 82 of 1993	
(Repealed by Statute Law Revision (Repeals) Act 1999 (No. 3 of 1999))
Pharmacists (Amendment) Act 1993 (repealed)	No. 90 of 1993	
(Repealed by Statute Law Revision (Repeals) Act 1999 (No. 3 of 1999))
Physiotherapists (Amendment) Act 1993 (repealed)	No. 87 of 1993	
(Repealed by Statute Law Revision (Repeals) Act 1999 (No. 3 of 1999))
Planning and Environment (Amendment) Act 1993 (repealed)	No. 128 of 1993	
(Repealed by Statute Law Revision (Repeals) Act 1999 (No. 3 of 1999))
Police Regulation (Discipline) (Amendment) Act 1993 (repealed)	No. 118 of 1993	
(Repealed by Statute Law Revision (Repeals) Act 1999 (No. 3 of 1999))
Police Regulation (Discipline) Act 1993 (repealed)	No. 35 of 1993	
(Repealed by Legislation Reform (Repeals No. 2) Act 2008 (No. 16 of 2008))
Probate Duty (Amendment) Act 1993 (repealed)	No. 81 of 1993	
(Repealed by Statute Law Revision (Repeals) Act 1999 (No. 3 of 1999))
Public Sector Management (Amendment) Act 1993	No. X of 1993	
Racing (Amendment) Act 1993	No. X of 1993	
Racing (Further Amendment) Act 1993 (repealed)	No. 77 of 1993	
(Repealed by Statute Law Revision (Repeals) Act 1999 (No. 3 of 1999))
Residential Tenancies (Water and Utilities Charges) Act 1993	No. X of 1993	
Sentencing (Amendment) Act 1993	No. X of 1993	
Sheep Owners Protection (Repeal) Act 1993	No. X of 1993	
Shop Trading (Further Amendment) (Amendment) Act 1993 (repealed)	No. 4 of 1993	
(Repealed by Statute Law Revision (Repeals) Act 1999 (No. 3 of 1999))
Stamps (Amendment) Act 1993 (repealed)	No. 17 of 1993	
(Repealed by Statute Law Revision (Repeals) Act 1999 (No. 3 of 1999))
Stamps (Further Amendment) Act 1993	No. X of 1993	
State Taxation (Further Amendment) Act 1993	No. X of 1993	
Subdivision (Amendment) Act 1993 (repealed)	No. 57 of 1993	
(Repealed by Legislation Reform (Repeals No. 3) Act 2008 (No. 53 of 2008))
Subordinate Legislation (Amendment) Act 1993 (repealed)	No. 13 of 1993	
(Repealed by Statute Law Revision (Repeals) Act 1999 (No. 3 of 1999))
Tobacco (Amendment) Act 1993 (repealed)	No. 83 of 1993	
(Repealed by Statute Law Revision (Repeals) Act 1999 (No. 3 of 1999))
Transport (Amendment) Act 1993	No. X of 1993	
Treasury Corporation of Victoria (Debt Centralisation) Act 1993 (repealed)	No. 31 of 1993	
(Repealed by Statute Law Revision (Repeals) Act 1999 (No. 3 of 1999))
Unclaimed Moneys (Amendment) Act 1993	No. X of 1993	
Vocational Education and Training (College Employment) Act 1993	No. X of 1993	
Water (Amendment) Act 1993 (repealed)	No. 69 of 1993	
(Repealed by Statute Law Revision (Repeals) Act 1999 (No. 3 of 1999))

== Sources ==
- "1993 Victorian Historical Acts". AustLII.
