= Portland, Victoria =

Portland
- City
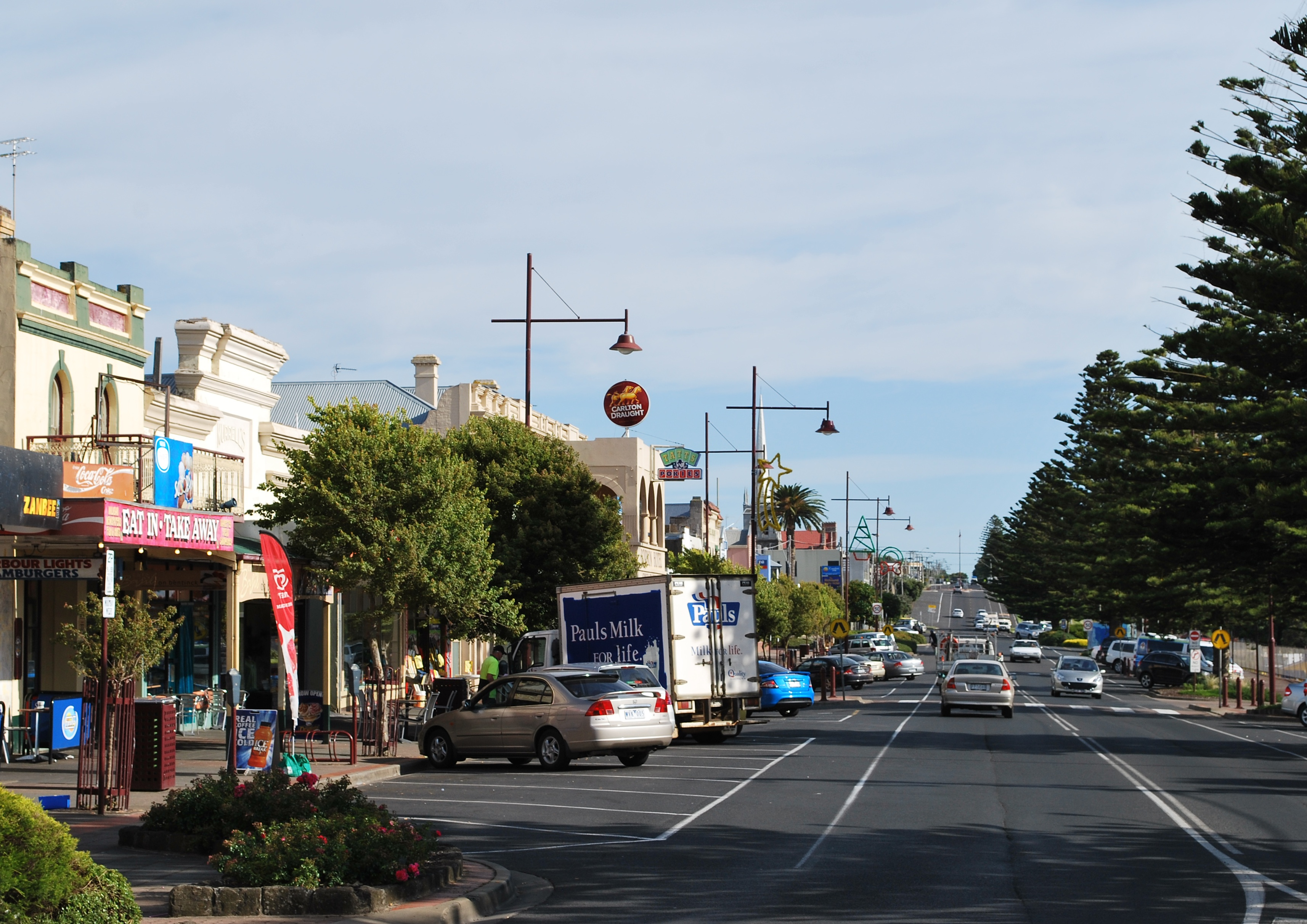
- Bentinck Street, looking north

- Coordinates: 38°20′0″S 141°36′0″E
- Country: Australia
- State: Victoria
- LGA: Shire of Glenelg
- Location: 362 km (225 mi) W of Melbourne; 97 km (60 mi) W of Warrnambool
- Established: 1834

Population
  - Total: 10,016 (2021)
- Postcode: 3305
- Mean max temp: 17.7 °C (63.9 °F)
- Mean min temp: 9.3 °C (48.7 °F)
- Annual rainfall: 848.3 mm (33.40 in)

Portland (/ˈpɔːrtlənd/ PORT-lənd) is a city in Victoria, Australia, and is the oldest European settlement in the state. It is also the main urban centre in the Shire of Glenelg and is located on Portland Bay. As of the 2021 census the population was 10,016, increasing from a population of 9,712 taken at the 2016 census.

== History ==
=== Early history ===
The Gunditjmara, an Aboriginal Australian people, are the traditional owners of much of south-west Victoria, including what is now Portland, having lived there for thousands of years. They are today renowned for their early aquaculture development at nearby Lake Condah. Physical remains such as the weirs and fish traps are to be found in the Budj Bim heritage areas. The Gunditjmara were a settled people, living in small circular weather-proof stone huts about 1 metre (3 ft 3 in) high, grouped as villages, often around eel traps and aquaculture ponds. On just one hectare of Allambie Farm, archaeologists have discovered the remains of 160 house sites.

==== 19th century European settlement ====
Portland was named in 1800 by the British navigator James Grant, who sailed in the Lady Nelson along the Victorian coast. "I also distinguished the Bay by the name of Portland Bay, in honour of His Grace the Duke of Portland", wrote Grant. The bay, the only deep sea port between Adelaide and Melbourne, offers a sheltered anchorage against the often wild weather of Bass Strait.

By the early 19th century, whalers and sealers were working the treacherous waters of Bass Strait, and Portland Bay provided good shelter and fresh water, which enabled them to establish the first white settlement in the area. Whaling captain William Dutton is known to have been resident in the Portland Bay area when the Henty clan arrived, and is said to have provided seed potatoes for the Henty garden.

The Convincing Ground massacre, in which 20 native owners of the land were massacred by whalers, occurred in Portland Bay in 1833 or 1834, following a dispute about a beached whale between whalers and the Kilcarer gundidj clan of the Gunditjmara people.

In 1834, the year before Melbourne was founded, Edward Henty and his family, who had migrated from England to Western Australia in 1829, and then moved to Van Diemen's Land, ferried some of their stock across the Strait in search of the fine grazing land of the Western District. After a voyage of 34 days, the Thistle arrived at Portland Bay on 19 November 1834. Henty was only 24 years old, and, early in December, cultivated the land using a plough he had made himself. He was the first white man to turn a sod in Victoria. The next voyage of the Thistle brought his brother Francis, with additional stock and supplies, and in a short time houses were erected and fences put up.

In his diary entry for 3 December 1834, Henty wrote:

Arrived at 6 p.m., made the boat fast in the middle of the river, and started three days' walk in the bush accompanied by H Camfield, Wm Dutton, five men, one black woman and 14 dogs, each man with a gun and sufficient quantity of damper to last for the voyage.

In the 5 December entry Henty wrote:

On descending the hill we saw a native. He immediately ran on seeing us. He was busily employed pulling the gums from the wattle trees.

Henty sowed the first Victorian wheat crop on clifftop land, known today as "The Ploughed Field". The Henty brothers established a shore-based whaling station at Portland. They went on to own five vessels engaged in the trade.

The Hentys were "discovered" in Portland by the explorer Thomas Mitchell in 1836. The squatter settlement was illegal since, at that time, the British Colonial Office policy was to contain colonial settlements in Australia within geographic limits. It had been still considering how to deal with the rights to the land of Aboriginal Victorians. The Hentys also farmed in areas known as "Australia Felix", around Casterton.

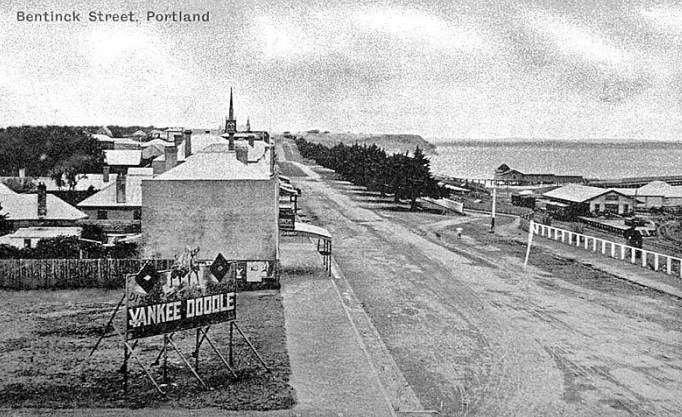
Bentinck Street looking north from Gawler Street.

By 1838, land auctions had been authorised from Sydney, and Charles Tyers surveyed the Portland township in 1839. "It was government policy to encourage squatters to take possession of whatever land they chose". A Post Office was opened on 4 December 1841, the third to open in the Port Phillip District after Melbourne and Geelong.

During the 1840s the Eumeralla Wars between Europeans and Gunditjmara took place in the area between Portland and Port Fairy.

At Wesleyan Mission meeting in 1841, Rev. Benjamin Hurst (missionary to Aboriginal people at Port Phillip) noted that in the Portland bay area "it was usual for some to go out in parties on the Sabbath with guns, for the ostensible purpose of kangarooing, but, in reality to hunt and kill these miserable beings".

Around 1842 a Presbyterian church and school were founded by the Rev. Alexander Laurie (c. 1817–1854), who later ran the Portland Herald. His widow Janet Laurie (Black) and two sons founded The Border Watch in nearby Mount Gambier.

From the time of European settlement, the region around Melbourne was known as the Port Phillip District, and this gained some administrative status prior to separation from New South Wales and the declaration as the Colony of Victoria in 1851.

=== 1985: Proclamation as a city ===
Portland was proclaimed a city on Monday 28 October 1985, in the presence of Charles, Prince of Wales and Diana, Princess of Wales.

== Governance and demographics ==
Portland is in the Victorian Legislative Assembly electoral district of South West Coast, the Western Victoria Region of the Victorian Legislative Council and the federal Division of Wannon. It is in the local government area of the Shire of Glenelg. Its postcode is 3305.

On 30 March 2007, the Gunditjmara people were recognised by the Federal Court of Australia to be the native title-holders of almost 140,000 hectares (350,000 acres) of Crown land and waters in the Portland region. On 27 July 2011, together with the Eastern Maar people, the Gunditjmara People were recognised to be the native title-holders of almost 4,000 hectares (9,900 acres) of Crown land in the Yambuk region, including Lady Julia Percy Island, known to them as Deen Maar. The Gunditjmara People are represented by the Gunditj Mirring Traditional Owners Aboriginal Corporation.

As of August 2020, after a question raised at a council meeting by resident Shea Rotumah, who is of the kilcarer gundidj clan of the Gunditjmara people, the council is undertaking an audit of their colonial monuments, to assess the "nature and magnitude of monuments and place names across the shire". The mayor, Anita Rank, sees it as "an amazing opportunity for our community to be better educated".

At the 2021 census Portland had a population of 10,016 people.

== Economy ==
=== Port ===
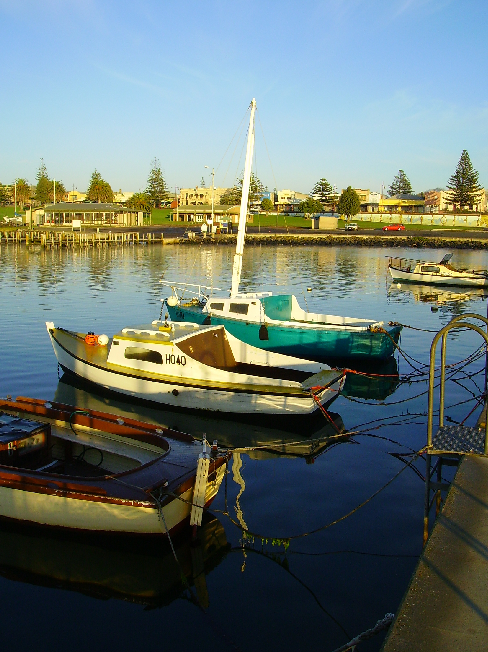
Boat marina in Portland Harbour, facing west.

Through the 19th century Portland developed to become an important fishing port providing for the town and later, with the connection of the railway, to the region as far afield as Ballarat and eventually Melbourne. Barracouta, Australian salmon and crayfish (now southern rock lobster) were the main catches with many fishermen working the bay, around the Lawrence Rocks and in the season, Bridgewater Bay.

Portland's harbour enabled the development of the wool growing industry of the Western District, however it has since lost its primacy to facilities at Geelong. Even in western Victoria, Portland fell behind Warrnambool as the main commercial centre. In the 20th century, Portland's role as a port revived, and its economy was also boosted by the tourism industry and an aluminium smelter.

The port of Portland was sold in 1996 by the State Government to a group including the listed New Zealand company Infratil & the Scott Corporation (owned by Allan Scott), the first privatisation of port facilities in Australia. Since then, it has been traded a number of times and is now owned by two institutional investors – the publicly listed Australian Infrastructure Fund and Utilities Trust of Australia, a private infrastructure fund – both of which are managed by Hastings Funds Management.

As new supertankers have emerged, Portland, along with Hastings in Western Port Bay was proposed as an alternative to the controversial plans for deepening of Melbourne's shallower Port Phillip. The plans are aimed at maintaining Victoria's shipping status (since Melbourne has become Australia's busiest port, the Victorian economy relies heavily on the import and export of goods). Due to environmental reasons, the plan to deepen Port Phillip has been heavily criticised, whereas Portland offers some of the necessary infrastructure with minimum environmental impact.

The Port of Portland has received major assistance through public funding of an A$18 million overpass which gives better access to the port for heavy traffic. In 2007, the Glenelg Shire Council adopted a plan for the redesign and development of the foreshore precinct including a new multi purpose marina in the north-west corner of the harbour.

=== Portland Aluminium ===
Alcoa is Victoria's largest exporter. The Portland aluminium smelter is located in Portland in South West Victoria. The smelter was commissioned in 1987 and is managed by Alcoa World Alumina and Chemicals for Portland Aluminium (a joint venture project between Alcoa (55%), CITIC (22.5%) and Marubeni (22.5%)).

Portland is Australia's third largest aluminium smelter, with a capacity of around 352,000 tonnes of aluminium per annum. The majority of Portland's production is supplied to the export market.

The Portland Aluminium smelter, in conjunction with Alcoa's Point Henry smelter which closed in 2014, produced about 30% of Australia's total aluminium.

=== The fishing industry today ===
Portland today is the home of a varied professional fishing fleet of approximately 60 vessels, harvesting a wide variety of sustainable commercial species. During the austral summer (November to May), the Bonney Upwelling (part of the larger Great South Australian Coastal Upwelling System) brings nutrient-rich deep ocean water to the surface in the Portland area, supporting a rich abundance of marine life. Trawlers target deepsea finfish such as rockling, hoki, blue eye trevalla and more, while Southern rock lobster, giant crab, blacklip and greenlip abalone, arrow squid, wrasse and others are also landed in significant quantities. The industry is a significant employer and directly generates approximately $30 million in export and domestic earnings for the town with major flow-on benefits through local seafood processing (both export and domestic), transport & engineering services, fuel supplies and other ancillary industries. An abalone hatchery has been established on the shores of Portland Bay and apart from some current difficulties, is likely to be an indicator of future seafood production. Easy access to prime locations supports a flourishing amateur angling fraternity, with many locals and tourists regularly enjoying a fresh catch of King George Whiting, Snapper, Kingfish, Flathead, Morwong and in recent times, Southern bluefin tuna.

=== Vestas Portland ===
The first blades from the Vestas Portland plant were produced in July 2005 and the plant was officially commissioned in August 2005. The facility cost $9 million, and has a capacity of 225 blades (75 blade sets) per annum. Vestas began manufacturing wind turbines in 1979. Their core business comprises the development, manufacture, sale, marketing and maintenance of wind power systems. The blade manufacturing facility in Portland worked in conjunction with their assembly plant in Tasmania which has since been closed down. In August 2007, Vestas announced the closure of its near new Portland blade manufacturing plant with the loss of 130 jobs.

=== Portland Wind Project ===
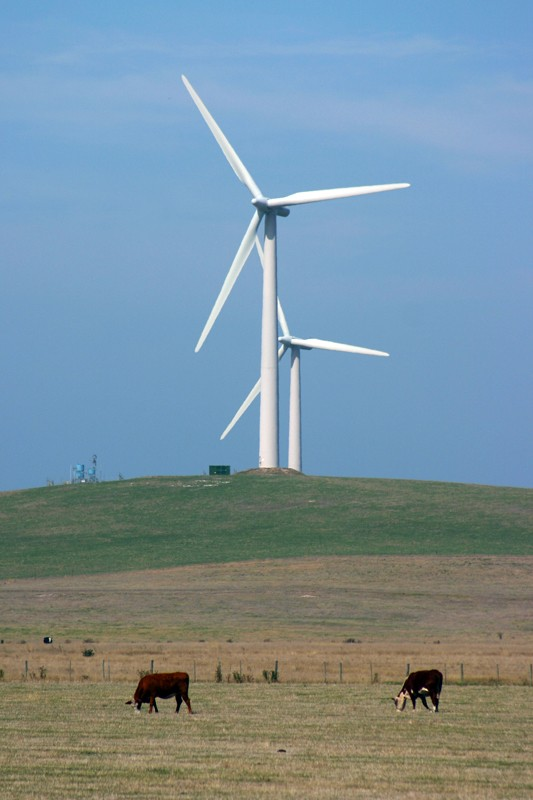
Wind Farm on the Port Fairy – Portland Road

The Portland Wind Energy Project, PWEP involves the development of four wind farms at Cape Bridgewater, Cape Nelson, Cape Sir William Grant and Yambuk in south-west Victoria. As one of the biggest wind farm developments in the Southern Hemisphere, the 195MW project proponents claimed that it will deliver major environmental, economic and social benefits.

The four Portland sites are considered by the proponents of the project to be ideal wind farm locations, with consistently strong winds, access for construction vehicles and machinery, a nearby connection to the National Electricity Grid, compatible farming activities and a large land area. By August 2007 construction was underway but there is still ongoing substantial resident opposition to the project regarding the planning process enabling this development and the visual impact of towers and the power lines.

The 195MW project will produce enough clean electricity to power about 125,000 homes each year, equal to more than 7 per cent of Victoria's residential electricity demand, or powering a city the size of Geelong. The project is being developed by Pacific Hydro.

=== Geothermal power ===
Geothermal heating was used to heat more than 19,000 square metres of municipal buildings, a motel and the town 2000m³ swimming pool in Portland. Commissioned in 1983, naturally hot groundwater (58 °C) was extracted from a bore (1400m deep) at a rate of 90 litres/second. The total capacity of the Portland facility, operated by the Glenelg Shire was 10.4 MW before being closed down prematurely in April 2006.

=== Tourism ===
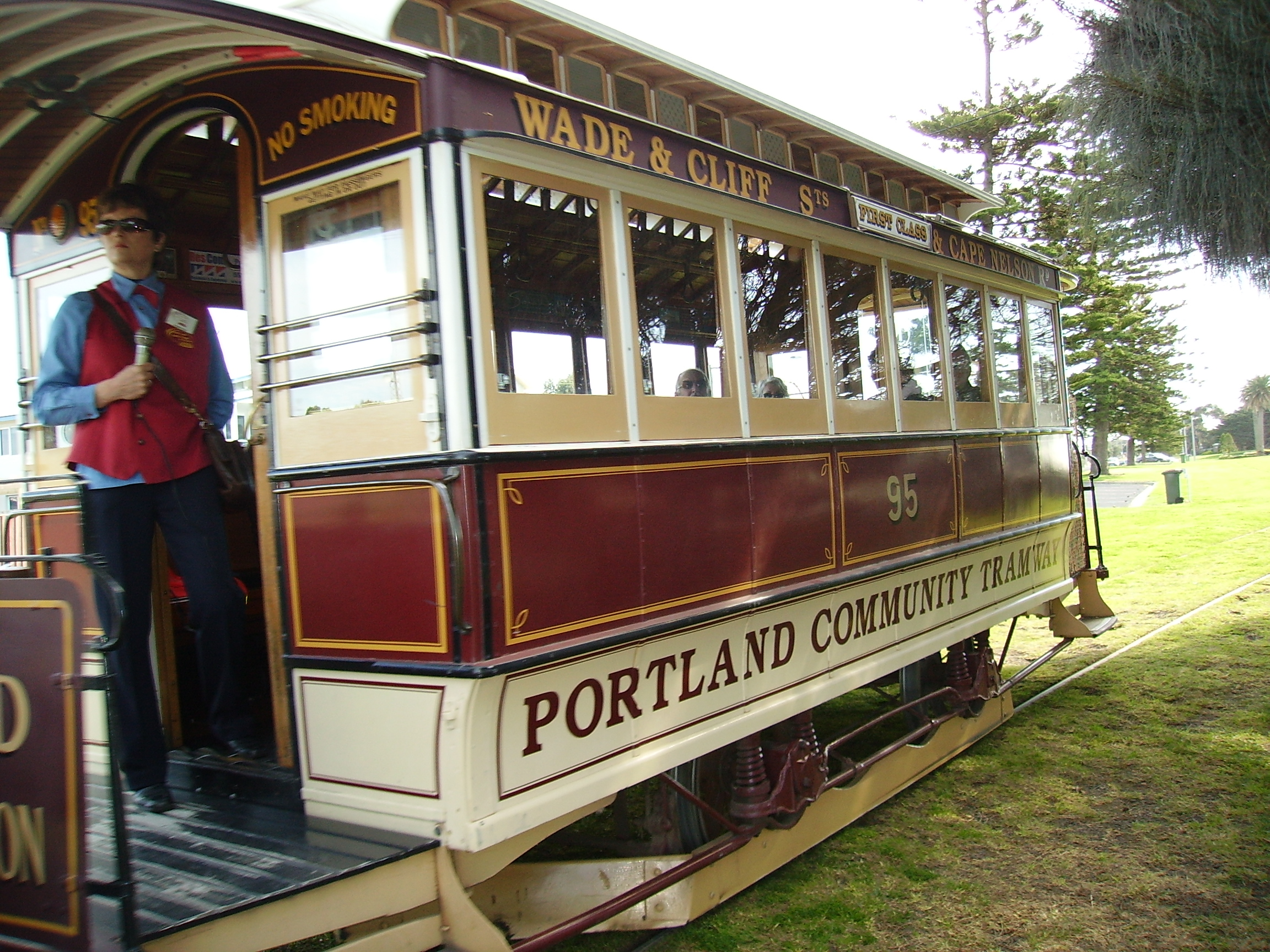
The tram, powered by a small combustion engine, en route from Wade Street to the Henty Park depot.

The Great South West Walk is a 250-kilometre (160 mi) walking track that begins at the Visitor Information Centre, Portland. Designed as a long distance walking track, it is also ideal for short walks and day walks. The walk travels through forests, river gorges, cliff tops and sublime bays. Established in 1981 the walk is administered, maintained and promoted by 'The Friends of the Great South West Walk Inc', a wholly volunteer organisation, in partnership with Parks Victoria.

The Portland Cable Tram was established as a community organisation in June 1996, with the view to laying light rail to carry refurbished diesel powered trams, as both an outlet for rail and heritage enthusiasts and a tourist venture. The tram carries passengers along the scenic route from Henty Park to the World War 2 Memorial Lookout, at the old North Portland Water Tower. The route takes in the natural wetlands (tidal) of Fawthrop Lagoon Park, the foreshore, cliff tops and botanic gardens. The Portland Cable Tram Group is planning additional tram carriages and engines, for greater capacity and to provide more reliability and maintenance support options. Volunteer drivers and conductors provide a commentary about Portland's significant past and present-day buildings, harbour and sights. Over 12,000 passengers were carried on the tram during the 2006–07 financial year.

=== Portland Maritime Museum ===
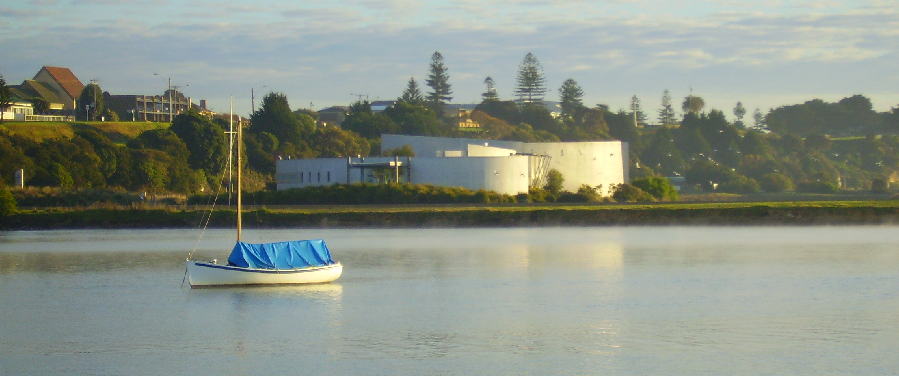
Maritime Discovery Centre, Tourist Information Centre.

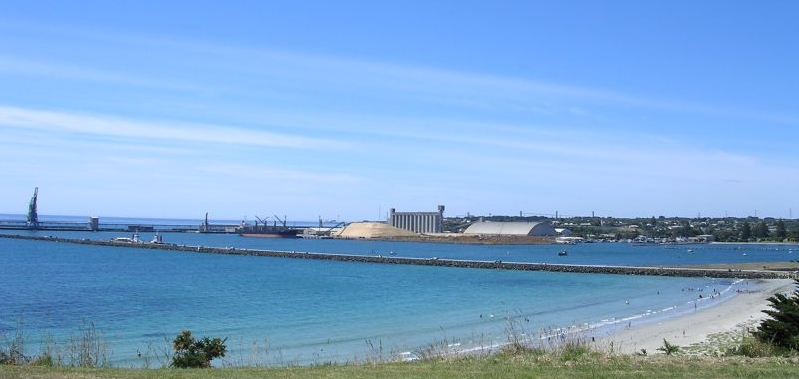
Nuns Beach, the breakwater and harbour

The Portland Maritime Museum was developed to house the Portland Lifeboat built in 1858. The Lifeboat is one of the oldest lifeboats remaining in the world. Famous for rescuing 19 survivors of the Admella shipwreck in 1859, and the Julia shipwreck in 1863. The Admella, a steamship of 392 tons, was sailing from Adelaide to Melbourne when it was smashed onto a reef off Carpenter Rocks in South Australia with a loss of 89 lives. The Portland Lifeboat and crew were taken to the scene, and were pivotal in the rescue operations. On display is a real whale skeleton, and the famed 'Portland Lifeboat' used in the Admella rescue.

== Transport ==
=== Road ===
Portland is 362 kilometres (225 mi) west of Melbourne via the Princes Highway. It is connected to Hamilton by the Henty Highway.

=== Rail ===
Portland is served by the standard gauge Maroona-Portland line, which branches from the main Western standard gauge line. Until 1995 the line was broad gauge, the line having been opened on 19 December 1877. Passenger movements are by coach to Warrnambool where passengers transfer to rail, the last direct passenger train between Ararat and Portland was on 12 September 1981 operated by a DRC railcar. Grain is the most common commodity delivered by rail from the Wimmera.

Transport Minister Peter Batchelor, opened a $15m overpass in Cliff Street constructed for VicRoads in October 2006. The government committed to the project in May 2003, and work began in 2005. The overpass allows road transports and trains continuous access to the port; moving commodities like grain, fertiliser, wind-farm blades, aluminium ingots and woodchips. Port activity is projected to increase significantly and the overpass, which had been discussed since 1991, was finally installed. The project was completed three months ahead of schedule because of the drought and less than the expected delays due to rain.

Freight operator Pacific National indefinitely suspended all rail services to the town of Portland in 2004, impacting local companies including Portland Aluminium, transport company Kalari, and freight broker Anchor Logistics. Portland container traffic was conveyed between Maroona and Portland on grain services twice a week, but Pacific National said that due to the drought there were no trains to attach the loading to. On the route the price differential between rail and road is $12.97 per tonne in rail's favour. Pacific National closed their Portland operations in March 2008, with GrainCorp leasing a limited number of locomotives and rolling stock from them, but favour transporting grain to the Port of Geelong instead. In September 2008 it was announced that freight traffic would restart using the line from Portland, with operator El Zorro signing a multi-million deal with miner Iluka Resources to carry containerised mineral sands to Melbourne, with Iluka saying rail transport was cheaper than road.

=== Aviation ===
Portland is served by the Portland Airport (IATA: PTJ, ICAO: YPOD). Sharp Airlines provided a regular service to Portland and Warrnambool airports from Essendon airport up until 30 June 2019. Sharp Airlines started operations in Portland by flying staff and employees from Portland Aluminium to Avalon Airport, so they could link to the Point Henry Smelter near Geelong. With significant demand and the support of the community, non-charter, passenger flights were also added. Sharp has established a maintenance hub at Portland Airport, so support staff could service the growing commuter and tourist airline.

== Media ==
=== Radio ===
Community radio station 3RPC-FM 99.3 is located opposite The Arts Company, on the corner of Richmond Street, and broadcasts to the majority of the Shire of Glenelg. This too lends itself to the promotion of the city's various performances, exhibitions and cultural events. Each week volunteer presenters write and produce many hours of on-air entertainment covering arts, culture, sport, community news and special interest programs.

Portland tourist radio station is WAVE-FM, broadcasting easy listening music, news and information about local attractions.

== Arts & culture ==
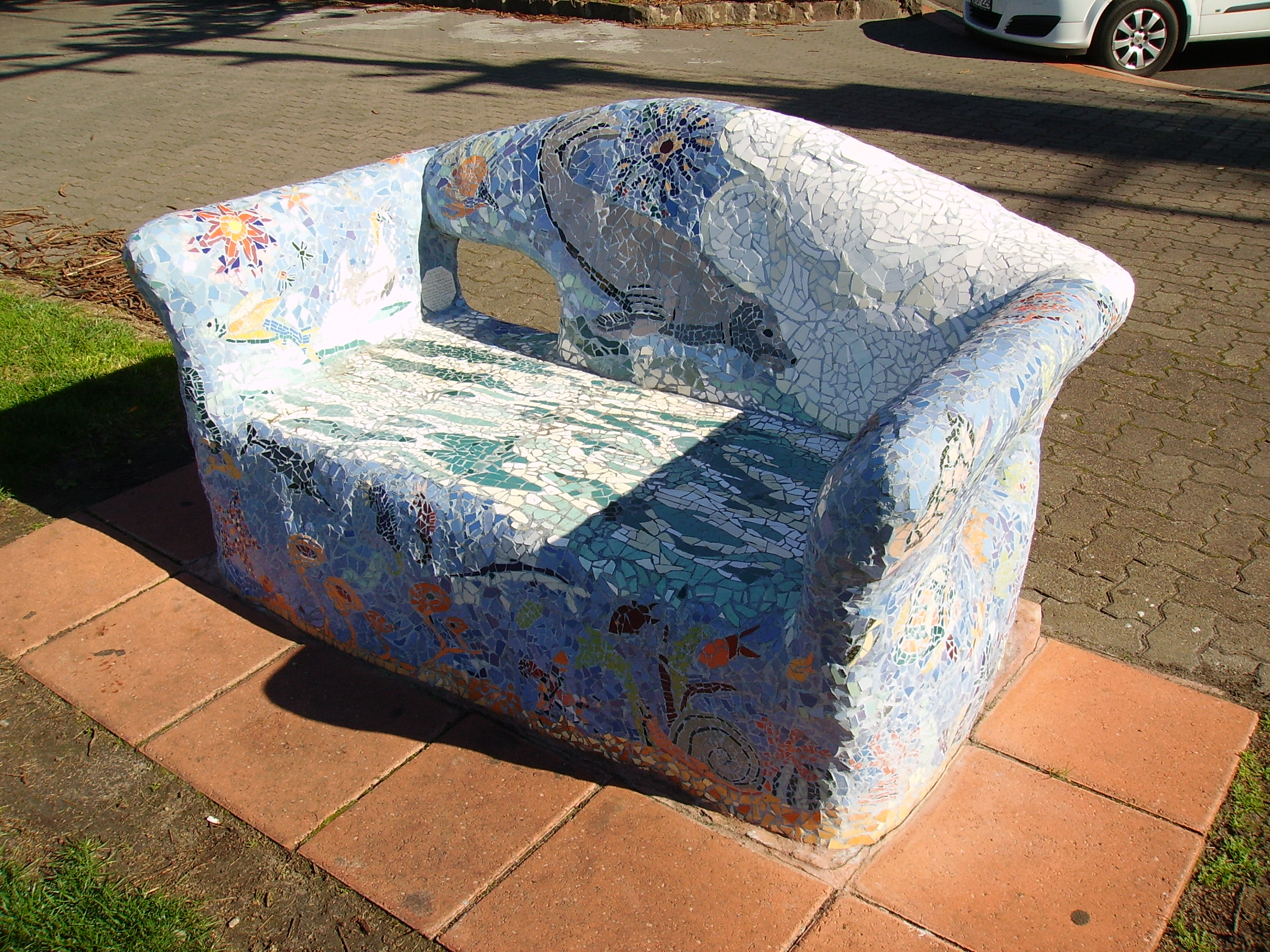
Mosaic work fostered by community arts programs. This seat is located in beachfront Bentinck Street.

Portland has a vibrant arts community, with many potters, painters, musicians, quilters, leadlighters, woodturners, photographers, cinematographers, multimedia artists, printmakers, jewellers, sculptors, actors and writers. Many of these artists are associated with CEMA Inc (Council for Encouragement of Music and the Arts) or The Arts Company.

The Portland Art Centre, on the corner of Glenelg and Bentinck Streets, incorporates a gallery and theatre, where local and visiting performances are regularly staged.

The Arts Company is located in the heritage precinct of Portland in refurbished old buildings in Julia Street. Along with community workshops and studios, local artists' works are also for sale. The Arts Company also has accommodation and studios for the artist in residence programs.

== Sport ==
The town has an Australian rules football team competing in the Hampden Football League. The club is known as Portland Football Netball Cricket Club.

The Portland and District Cricket Association is the local cricket association, with 6 clubs competing from the local area.

Golfers play at the course of the Portland Golf Club on Madeira Packet Road.

The Portland Hockey club plays in the Lower South East Hockey Association. Games are mainly played in Mount Gambier on an artificial turf pitch. However, some games are played in Portland at Nelson Park on grass pitches. Training is at Flinders Park.

Portland also has a soccer team, the Portland Panthers, and they play most of their games with the Mount Gambier Sides.

== Education ==
=== High schools ===
- Portland Secondary College (PSC)
- PSC Re-engagement Program
- Portland Bayview College

=== Primary schools ===
- Bundarra Primary School
- Portland Primary School
- Portland North Primary School
- Portland South Primary School
- Bolwarra Primary School
- All Saints Parish Primary School
- Narrawong District Primary School
- St Johns Lutheran Primary School
- Portland Bay School

== Climate ==
Portland has a cool mediterranean climate that is transitional with the oceanic climate (Köppen climate classification Csb/Cfb). Its summers as well as annual mean temperature, are extraordinarily cold for the latitude due to facing the coldest ocean in the world; the rainy winters have moderate lows. On 20th December 2019 record high reached 47 degrees Celsius.

Climate data for Portland Airport (1991–2020, extremes 1982–2024); 38.31° S, 141.47° E
Month	Jan	Feb	Mar	Apr	May	Jun	Jul	Aug	Sep	Oct	Nov	Dec	Year
Record high °C (°F)	42.5 (108.5)	43.1 (109.6)	40.5 (104.9)	34.2 (93.6)	26.8 (80.2)	20.6 (69.1)	18.7 (65.7)	24.4 (75.9)	31.0 (87.8)	32.8 (91.0)	35.5 (95.9)	43.6 (110.5)	43.6 (110.5)
Mean daily maximum °C (°F)	22.3 (72.1)	22.5 (72.5)	21.2 (70.2)	18.5 (65.3)	15.8 (60.4)	13.8 (56.8)	13.2 (55.8)	14.0 (57.2)	15.3 (59.5)	17.1 (62.8)	18.8 (65.8)	20.4 (68.7)	17.7 (63.9)
Mean daily minimum °C (°F)	12.5 (54.5)	13.0 (55.4)	11.7 (53.1)	9.7 (49.5)	8.3 (46.9)	6.8 (44.2)	6.4 (43.5)	6.7 (44.1)	7.5 (45.5)	8.5 (47.3)	9.9 (49.8)	11.0 (51.8)	9.3 (48.8)
Record low °C (°F)	1.6 (34.9)	4.1 (39.4)	2.5 (36.5)	1.2 (34.2)	0.0 (32.0)	−1.5 (29.3)	−2.3 (27.9)	−1.1 (30.0)	−0.6 (30.9)	−0.9 (30.4)	1.5 (34.7)	0.9 (33.6)	−2.3 (27.9)
Average rainfall mm (inches)	38.0 (1.50)	30.8 (1.21)	42.8 (1.69)	58.1 (2.29)	84.5 (3.33)	110.9 (4.37)	112.5 (4.43)	112.1 (4.41)	90.1 (3.55)	61.0 (2.40)	55.7 (2.19)	51.8 (2.04)	848.3 (33.40)
Average rainy days (≥ 1.0 mm)	5.1	4.6	7.6	9.9	14.2	16.0	17.3	17.0	14.2	10.5	8.5	7.6	132.5
Source: Australian Bureau of Meteorology

Rainfall and temperature records are found as early as 1857 and 1863 at the old Portland site, having terminated at 1956 for temperature readings but still recording rainfall (being one of the longest-running in Australia).

Climate data for Portland (1863–1956, rainfall 1857–2024); 38.35° S, 141.59° E
Month	Jan	Feb	Mar	Apr	May	Jun	Jul	Aug	Sep	Oct	Nov	Dec	Year
Record high °C (°F)	42.8 (109.0)	40.6 (105.1)	40.9 (105.6)	33.9 (93.0)	27.8 (82.0)	20.8 (69.4)	21.1 (70.0)	24.4 (75.9)	28.3 (82.9)	36.0 (96.8)	38.9 (102.0)	41.7 (107.1)	42.8 (109.0)
Mean daily maximum °C (°F)	21.8 (71.2)	21.9 (71.4)	20.7 (69.3)	18.4 (65.1)	16.1 (61.0)	14.1 (57.4)	13.6 (56.5)	14.4 (57.9)	15.8 (60.4)	17.3 (63.1)	18.8 (65.8)	20.5 (68.9)	17.8 (64.0)
Mean daily minimum °C (°F)	12.7 (54.9)	13.1 (55.6)	12.0 (53.6)	10.3 (50.5)	8.7 (47.7)	7.5 (45.5)	6.5 (43.7)	6.9 (44.4)	7.8 (46.0)	8.9 (48.0)	10.3 (50.5)	11.6 (52.9)	9.7 (49.4)
Record low °C (°F)	4.4 (39.9)	3.3 (37.9)	2.0 (35.6)	1.1 (34.0)	−0.6 (30.9)	−2.2 (28.0)	−2.8 (27.0)	−1.7 (28.9)	−0.3 (31.5)	0.6 (33.1)	2.2 (36.0)	3.3 (37.9)	−2.8 (27.0)
Average rainfall mm (inches)	35.6 (1.40)	32.5 (1.28)	42.1 (1.66)	63.8 (2.51)	87.9 (3.46)	99.0 (3.90)	108.4 (4.27)	106.8 (4.20)	84.5 (3.33)	68.5 (2.70)	52.0 (2.05)	44.7 (1.76)	822.9 (32.40)
Average rainy days (≥ 1.0 mm)	4.7	4.2	6.1	8.7	11.5	12.7	13.8	14.1	11.6	9.9	7.5	6.2	111.0
Source: Australian Bureau of Meteorology
