= Anglesea Heath =

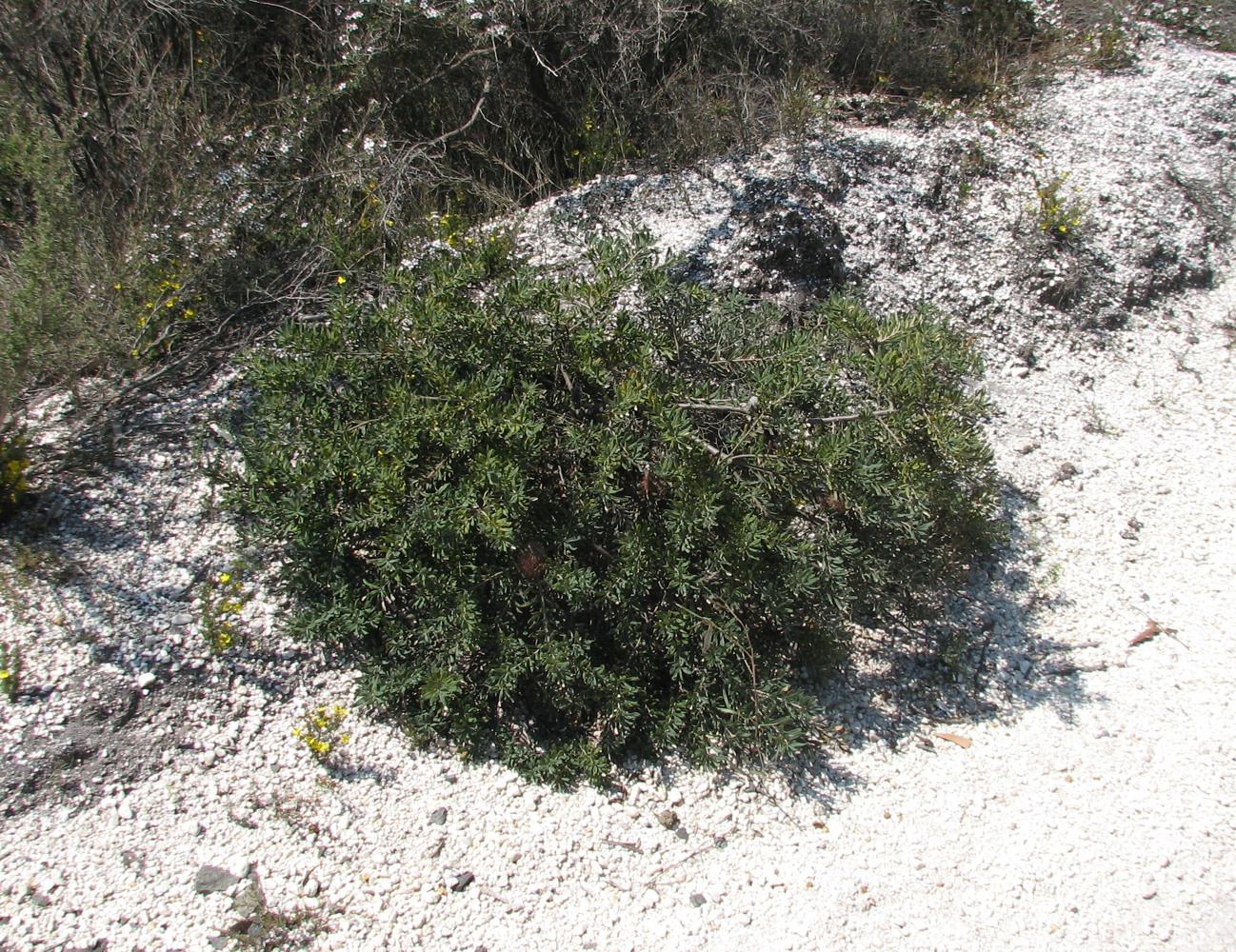
- Banksia marginata, located in Anglesea Heath

- Location within Victoria
- Interactive map of Anglesea Heath
- Type: Nature reserve
- Location: Victoria
- Nearest city: Anglesea
- Coordinates: 38°22′0″S 144°8′00″E
- Area: 7,200 hectares (18,000 acres)
- Operator: Parks Victoria
- Designation: Register of the National Estate (now defunct)

Anglesea Heath is a 7,200-hectare (18,000-acre) area of natural heath, woodland and forest in Victoria, south-eastern Australia. It is about 100 kilometres (62 mi) south-west of Melbourne, and is just north and west of the coastal town of Anglesea. Accessible via the Great Ocean Road, the Heath comprises 6,700 hectares (17,000 acres) of land managed for conservation, and 500 hectares (1,200 acres) of land used for coal mining and power generation by Alcoa Australia, at its Anglesea Power Station.

Anglesea Heath is subject to a cooperative management agreement between the Secretary of the Department of Sustainability and Environment, Victoria and Alcoa, and is managed by Parks Victoria. The Heath is notable for its floristic value, and is listed on the now-defunct Australian Register of the National Estate for its botanical value.
