= List of alumina refineries =

This is a list of alumina refineries in the world. The list is incomplete and missing some data.

== Smelter-grade alumina refineries ==
Country	Location	Coordinates	Total Annual Capacity (kt)	Ownership
Australia	Nhulunbuy, Northern Territory	12°10′57″S 136°46′55″E	3,500, closed in 2014	Rio Tinto Alcan
Australia	Gladstone, Queensland	23°52′1″S 151°17′25″E	3,954	80% Rio Tinto Alcan 20% Rusal
Australia	Yarwun, Queensland	23°49′36″S 151°9′13″E	3,400	100% Rio Tinto
Australia	Kwinana, Western Australia	32°11′40″S 115°46′38″E	2,150	100% Alcoa World Alumina & Chemicals
Australia	Pinjarra, Western Australia	32°38′40″S 115°56′58″E	4,200	100% Alcoa World Alumina & Chemicals
Australia	Wagerup, Western Australia	32°55′2″S 115°54′50″E	2,400	100% Alcoa World Alumina & Chemicals
Australia	Worsley Alumina, Worsley, Western Australia	33°13′57″S 116°4′6″E	4,600	86% South32, 10% Japan Alumina Associates, 4% Sojitz Alumina
Azerbaijan	Gyandzha Alumina	40°41′29″N 46°24′38″E	peak of 410 in 1988, closed as of 1997 due to energy issues	Azeralyuminii (Levine, 1996); DET.Al Holding
Bosnia Herzegovina	Birac	44°25′10″N 19°6′46″E	600	Energoinvest Alumina (United Nations 2000)
Bosnia Herzegovina	Mostar Alumina	43°16′30″N 17°49′14″E		Energoinvest Alumina
Brazil	Alumar, Sao Luis, Maranhao	2°42′32″S 44°20′49″W	3,500	19% Alcoa World Alumina & Chemicals, 35% Alcoa, 36% South32, 10% Rio Tinto
Brazil	Pocos De Caldas, Alcominas	21°50′30″S 46°35′24″W	390	100% Alcoa
Brazil	Belem, Alunorte, Barcarena, Pará	1°32′43″S 48°44′4″W	6,300	86.0% Norsk Hydro, 3.6% CBA, 1.2% Japan Alunorte Investment, 0.1% Mitsubishi Corp., 0.2% Mitsui & Co, 3.8% NAAC (Hydro Aluminium 2004)
Brazil	Alumínio	23°31′53″S 47°15′59″W	940	100% Cia Brasileira de Aluminio
Brazil	Alumina Rondon	4°46′40″S 48°04′02″W	3,000 in 2019	100% Cia Brasileira de Aluminio
Brazil	Ouro Preto	20°24′00″S 43°31′19″W	150	66.67% Hindustan Aluminium, 33.33% Novelis
Canada	Saguenay, Quebec	48°25′37″N 71°9′44″W	1,400	100% Rio Tinto (Alcan 2006)
China	Chalco Mining		2,410	100% Chinalco
China	Chongqing branch		800	100% Chinalco
China	Guizhou Huajin		1,600	100% Chinalco
China	Guangxi Pingguo branch	23°20′12″N 107°29′43″E	2,210	100% Chinalco
China	Chalco Shandong		2,270	100% Chinalco
China	Shanxi New Material Alumina	35°39′24″N 110°40′25″E	2,600	100% Chinalco
China	Shanxi Huaxing		2,000	100% Chinalco
China	Xinghua Technology		900	100% Chinalco
China	Dingtai Tuoyuan		150	
China	East Hope (Sanmenxia)	34°44′35″N 111°14′18″E	650	
China	Guixi Huayin		200	
China	Jiaokou		50	
China	Kaiman		1100	
China	Lubei		320	
China	Luneng Jinbei		975	
China	Nanchuan		0	
China	Nanshan		400	
China	Pingdingshan		375	
China	Shanxi Tongde		0	
China	Luneng Jinbei		975	
China	Wanji Xiangjiang	34°45′14″N 112°4′20″E	400	
China	Weiqiao		2500	
China	Wusheng (Pinglu)		200	
China	Xinfa Huayu (Chiping Xinfa)		2300	
China	Yangquan		400	
China	Yimei		150	
China	Yunnan		0	
China	Zhengzhou		2490	
China	Zhongmei		83	
China	Zhongzhou Aluminum	35°23′14″N 113°27′2″E	3,050	100% Chinalco
China	Zunyi Aluminum		1,000	100% Chinalco
Germany	Stade Alumina		> 1,000	Dadco Alumina and Chemicals Ltd, VAW aluminium AG
Greece	Distomon Alumina		830	100% Mytilineos Holdings through Rio Tinto through Pechiney
Guinea	Friguia		755	100% Alumina Company of Guinea
Guinea	Sangaredi - currently in Feasibility Study	11°5′26″N 13°59′38″W	0	33% Global Alumina, 33% BHP, 25% Emirates Global Aluminium, 8.3% Mubadala Development Company PJSC
India	Visakhapatnam, Andhra Pradesh, re-named to Pioneer Aluminum Industries Limited in 2007	17°35′34″N 82°45′8″E	1500	Penna Group (68%), Rescom Group through its investment arm KCap Holdings (26%) and others, since 2021.
India	Belgaum, Karnataka		390	Indal, Hindalco (United Nations 2000)
India	NALCO, Damanjodi, Odisha	18°46′26″N 82°53′37″E	2,275	NALCO (United Nations 2000)
India	Gujarat Alumina Project			
India	Korba Alumina, Chhattisgarh	22°23′39″N 82°43′53″E	205	Bay Area Laboratory Co-operative, Sterlite Industries (United Nations 2000)
India	Vedanta Alumina, Lanjigarh, Odisha	19°42′24″N 83°22′00″E	1000 (to be 1400 in 2011)	Vedanta Resources
India	Mettur Alumina, Tamil Nadu	11°48′32″N 77°49′44″E	100	Malco, Sterlite Industries (United Nations 2000)
India	Muri Alumina		120	Indal, Hindalco (United Nations 2000)
India	Renukoot Alumina, Uttar Pradesh		700	Hindalco (United Nations 2000)
India	Utkal Alumina International Limited, Doraguda, Rayagada, Odisha	19°11′23″N 83°1′43″E	1500	Hindalco
Iran	Jajarm			
Ireland	Aughinish Alumina Ltd.	52°37′35″N 9°3′53″W	1,900	United Company of Rusal 100% (Rusal 2007)
Italy	Eurallumina	39°12′26″N 8°23′50″E	0 - closed 2009	United Company of Rusal 100% (Rusal 2007)
Jamaica	Clarendon		1,400	50% Alcoa World Alumina & Chemicals, 50% Jamaican Government
Jamaica	Ewarton Alumina		675	Jamaican Government, United Company of Rusal
Jamaica	Nain St. Elizabeth (Alpart)		1,700	65% United Company of Rusal, 35% Hydro Aluminium
Jamaica	Kirkvine Alumina		625	Jamaican Government, United Company of Rusal
Japan	Ehime		0	100% Sumitomo Chemical
Japan	SAL Yokohama Alumina		0	100% Showa Denko KK
Japan	Shimizu Alumina		0	100% Nippon Light Metal (United Nations 2000)
Kazakhstan	Pavlodar Alumina		1,540	100% Alkaz (United Nations 2000)
Montenegro	Podgorica Alumina		0	Kombinat Aluminijuma Podgorica, CAV (United Nations 2000)
Romania	Oradea		400	shut down in 2002
Romania	Tulcea		600, stopped production June 2022	100% Alro SA, Slatina
Russia	Achinsk Alumina Refinery		1,100	100% United Company of Rusal
Russia	Bauxitogorsk		186	100% United Company of Rusal
Russia	Bogoslovsk	59°46′42″N 60°10′12″E	1100	100% United Company of Rusal
Russia	Komi Aluminium Project, Sosnogorsk, Komi Republic		1,400 (Under Construction)	United Company of Rusal
Russia	Ural Aluminium Smelter, Kamensk-Uralsky, Sverdlovsk Region	56°22′17″N 61°58′14″E	750	United Company of Rusal (United Nations 2000)
Russia	Pikalevo Alumina Refinery, Leningrad region		268	100% United Company of Rusal (United Nations 2000)
Russia	Volkhov Alumina		400	100% North-West Aluminium (United Nations 2000)
Saudi Arabia	Ras Al-Khair	27.5143°N 49.1727°E	1,800	100% Ma'aden
Spain	San Ciprian	43º41'56"N 7º27'50W	1,530	100% Alcoa World Alumina & Chemicals
Slovakia	Slovalco		0 - since at least 2010 only aluminum, not alumina, produced by the company	100% Zavod SNP (United Nations 2000)
Slovenia	Talum Alumina		0 - since at least 2010 only aluminum, not alumina, produced by the company	100% Eti Holding S.A.
Suriname	Paranam	5°35′35.91″N 55°6′11.11″W	0	100% Alcoa World Alumina & Chemicals
Turkey	Seydisehir Alumina		200	100% Eti Holding S.A. (United Nations 2000)
Ukraine	Zaporizhzhia Aluminium Combine, Zaporizhzhia City	47°53′27″N 35°12′14″E	270	United Company of Rusal
Ukraine	Mykolaiv Alumina Refinery		1421	100% United Company of Rusal
United Arab Emirates	Al-Taweelah Alumina Refinery	24°47′33″N 54°42′28″E	2,000	100% Emirates Global Aluminium
United Kingdom	Burntisland		120 (closed 2002)	100% Rio Tinto (United Nations 2000)
USA	Gramercy, Louisiana	30.0611°N 90.6673°W	1,215 (close to 50% specialty alumina)	New Day Aluminum
US Virgin Islands	St Croix		600 (closed since 2000)	100% Alcoa World Alumina & Chemicals (Plunkert 1997)
USA	Burnside, Louisiana	30°8′17″N 90°55′23″W	560 (closed 2020)	100% Almatis
USA	Corpus Christi, Texas	27°53′0″N 97°15′32″W	1,610 (closed 2016)	Sherwin Alumina Company, wholly owned by Glencore
USA	Point Comfort, Texas	28°39′3″N 96°33′45″W	2,330 (idled 2016, closed 2020)	100% Alcoa World Alumina & Chemicals
Venezuela	Bauxilum		2,000	Corporacion Venezolana de Guayana
Venezuela	Venalum		0	Corporacion Venezolana de Guayana
Vietnam	Lam Dong Project		0	Pechiney, CAV
Vietnam	Tan Rai Alumina Project		0	

== Specialty alumina plants ==
Country	Location	Total Annual Capacity (kt)	Ownership
Canada	Brockville, Ontario	20	100% Rio Tinto Alcan (Alcan 2006)
Canada	Saguenay, Quebec	180	100% Rio Tinto Alcan (Alcan 2006)
China	Zhengzhou Institute	20	100% Chinalco
France	Beyrede	28	100% Rio Tinto Alcan (Alcan 2006)
France	Gardanne	650	100% Rio Tinto Alcan (Alcan 2006), specialty alumina only since 2007
France	La Bathie	31	100% Rio Tinto Alcan (Alcan 2006)
Germany	Martinswerk Alumina		100% Albemarle Corporation|-
Germany	Teutschenthal	28	100% Rio Tinto Alcan (Alcan 2006)
Germany	Schwandorf	265	Nabaltec AG since 1994
Hungary	Ajka		100% Silkem Hungary, specialty alumina only since 2013
Hungary	MOTIM-Magyarovar Alumina	75	GPS Kft., specialty alumina only since 2002
India	Hindalco, Belgaum Alumina Refinery	138	100% Hindalco
Russia	Boksitogorsk Alumina Refinery		100% United Company of Rusal
USA	Baton Rouge, Louisiana	specialty alumina only	100% Honeywell
USA	Gregory, Texas (closed 2016)	300	Sherwin Alumina Company
Korea	Mopko	180	South Korea General Chemical Corporation

== See also ==
- List of aluminium smelters

== Sources ==
- Alcan, (2006). An Evolving Alcan: Alcan Facts 2006, Canada: Alcan.
- Platt's Metal Week, 27 October 1997, p. 6
- Plunkert, P (1997). Bauxite and Alumina, United States Geological Survey
- Hydro Aluminium, (2004). Shaping Solutions for the Future, Oslo: Hydro Media.
- United Nations, (2000). United Nations Conference on Trade and Development: Recent and Planned Changes in Production Capacity for Bauxite, Alumina and Aluminium
