= Alumina Limited =

Australian holding company

- Traded as: ASX: AWC
- Industry: Mining
- Predecessor: Western Mining Corporation
- Founded: 11 December 2002; 23 years ago
- Headquarters: Melbourne, Australia
- Key people: W Peter Day (Chairman); Mike Ferraro (Managing Director)
- Products: Aluminium, bauxite
- Net income: $147 million (2020)
- Parent: Alcoa
- Subsidiaries: Alcoa World Alumina & Chemicals (40%)
- Website: aluminalimited.com

Alumina Limited is an Australian holding company. Spun off from Western Mining Corporation in 2002, its sole asset is a 40% shareholding in Alcoa World Alumina & Chemicals. In 2024, Alcoa acquired Alumina for US$2.2 billion.

== History ==
Alumina was founded in December 2002 when Western Mining Corporation spun off its aluminium and bauxite assets.

Alumina's only business activity is as the owner of a 40% share in Alcoa World Alumina & Chemicals (AWAC), a joint venture with Alcoa. AWAC owns two bauxite mines and three refineries (to extract aluminium oxide from bauxite) in Western Australia and owns a smelter (to extract pure aluminium) and has a 55% interest in the Portland aluminium smelter. AWAC also operates and has interests in Brazil, Guinea, Saudi Arabia and Spain.

In 2016, Alumina Limited achieved great short term authority over its interest in AWAC with more influence over a broader suite of operational and investment decisions.

Having been cross-listed on both the Australian Securities Exchange (ASX) and New York Stock Exchange (NYSE), Alumina delisted from the NYSE in February 2014, consolidating on the ASX.

In February 2024, Alcoa announced it would acquire Alumina for $2.2 billion in an all-stock deal. As part of the deal Alcoa would gain full ownership of AWAC. The acquisition was completed in August.
