= Mortlake Power Station =

Australian Gas-fired Power Station

- Country: Australia
- Location: Mortlake, Victoria
- Coordinates: 38°03′47.3″S 142°40′06″E
- Status: Peak
- Construction began: 2008
- Commission date: 2012
- Owner: Origin Energy

Thermal power station
- Primary fuel: Natural gas
- Turbine technology: Turbine

Power generation
- Nameplate capacity: 566 MW

The Mortlake Power Station is a 566 MW open cycle gas-fired power station developed by Origin Energy, located 12 km west of Mortlake, Victoria, Australia.

Construction of the $640 million power station began in 2008. It was initially due to be operational in 2010, and was completed in August 2012.

The plant is located on approximately 20 hectares of land with an extensive buffer zone around it. Although approvals were gained for approximately 1,000 MW (1,300,000 hp), the Mortlake Power Station was built to provide 566 MW. It is adjacent to the existing Moorabool to Heywood 500 kV high voltage transmission line. The plant is supplied with natural gas via an 83 km dedicated underground natural gas transmission pipeline from the Otway Gas Plant near Port Campbell, as part of the offshore Otway Gas Project.

In 2024, Origin approved construction of a $400m two-hour grid battery at 300 MW / 650 MWh.

One of the major assets that takes power from this station in at times is the Alcoa Portland Smelter.
