= Portland aluminium smelter =

Smelter in Portland, Victoria, Australia

Coordinates: 38°23′14″S 141°37′48″E

The Portland aluminium smelter is located at Portland, Victoria, Australia. The smelter has a production capacity of 345,000 tonnes of aluminium per year The smelter is a joint venture owned by Alcoa World Alumina & Chemicals (55%), CITIC (22.5%) and Marubeni (22.5%). Alcoa manages the smelter operations.

The smelter was commissioned between 1986 and 1988. It consists of two potlines of Alcoa A817 reduction cells, operating at a line current of over 310kA. Portland is the only smelter using this technology. Alumina is delivered bi-weekly from Western Australia via a ship known as "The Portland". From the harbour, it is transported to the smelter via an enclosed conveyor belt several kilometres long. The majority of aluminium ingots are trucked out of Portland to other ports, although some is shipped directly from the Port of Portland.

The smelter has been the subject of significant controversy since its inception in 1986. In 1984, under the leadership of John Cain, the ALP government signed a joint venture agreement with Alcoa to build an aluminium smelter at Portland. The state government entered into a deal with Alcoa, which provides for subsidised electricity until 2016, at a price linked to the world price of aluminium. It is estimated that the cost of electricity for the smelter is $14 per MWh (1.4 cents per kWh), and that it has cost the state more than $2 billion over 20 years. The Portland smelter is believed to consume between 8 and 10 per cent of the state's electricity. Given that most of this energy is derived from brown coal in the Latrobe Valley, the production of aluminium is a significant contributor to Victoria's greenhouse emissions.

In 2009 it was reported that the smelter in Portland has cost Victorian taxpayers $4.5 billion in subsidies. Rob Maclellan, who served as a minister under the Hamer and Kennett governments, said the decision to build the smelter 500 km away from the power station was a mistake and the subsidies given to the smelter should not continue.

In March 2010 it was announced that the operators of Loy Yang A power station (Loy Yang Power) had signed a contract with the smelter operators for the supply of electricity to power aluminium smelters at Portland and Point Henry until 2036, the previous power contracts expired in 2014.

In December 2016 the smelter lost power for more than 5 hours due to fault on the Victorian transmission network. In January 2020, tornadoes tore down pylons on a 500 kV transmission line, causing the 500 MW smelter to be connected only to the South Australia grid for weeks, supplied by the Mortlake Power Station. A 1 gigawatt (GW), 2.5 gigawatt-hour (GWh) grid battery was approved in 2025.

== See also ==
- List of aluminium smelters
