= Loy Yang Power Station =

Coal fired power station in Victoria, Australia

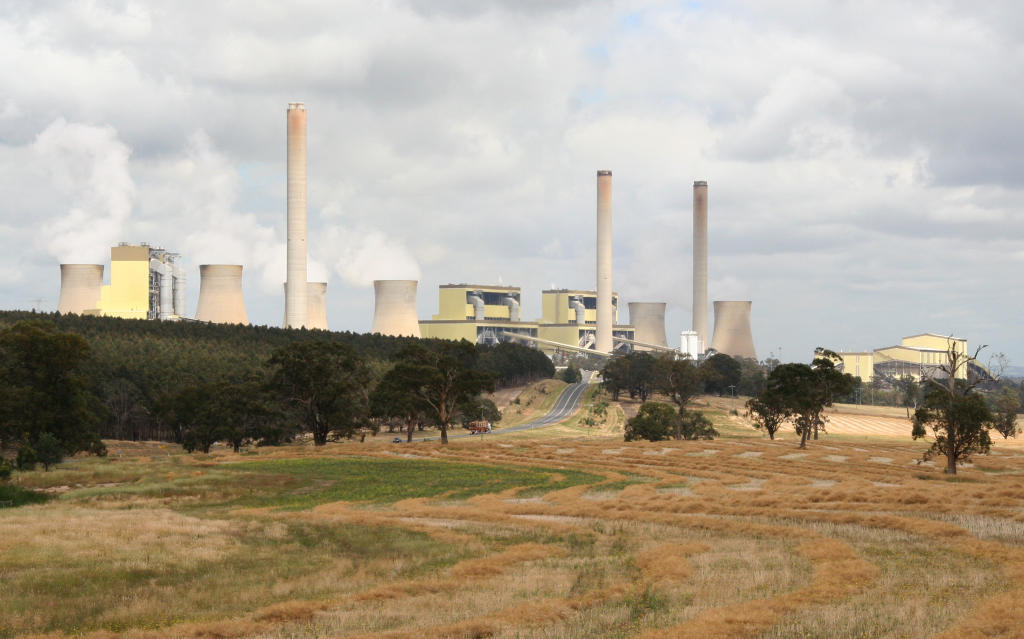
- Loy Yang B (left), Loy Yang A (centre), coal bunkers from open cut mine (right)
- Country: Australia
- Location: Traralgon, Victoria, Australia
- Coordinates: 38°15′16″S 146°34′37″E
- Status: Operational
- Commission date: 1985
- Owners: A: AGL Energy; B: Chow Tai Fook Enterprises 70%; Mitsui 30%

Thermal power station
- Primary fuel: Brown coal

Power generation
- Units operational: A: 3 × 560 MW (750,000 hp) & 1 x 530 MW (710,000 hp); B: 2 × 535 MW (717,000 hp)
- Make and model: Brown Boveri & Cie; Kraftwerk Union; Hitachi
- Nameplate capacity: 3,280 MW (4,400,000 hp)

External links
- Commons: Related media on Commons

The Loy Yang Power Station is a brown coal-fired thermal power station located on the outskirts of the city of Traralgon, in south-eastern Victoria, Australia. It consists of two sections, known as Loy Yang A (4 units) and Loy Yang B (2 units). Both Loy Yang A and B are supplied by the Loy Yang brown coal mine. The Loy Yang power stations are located in the brown coal rich Latrobe Valley, along with the Yallourn Power Station.

If Loy Yang A and Loy Yang B are counted together, they are the largest power station in Australia, generating 3280 MW of power (however, if counted separately, the 2,880 MW Eraring Power Station is the largest). Loy Yang A & B are base load power stations, and together produced 22 TWh in 2025, or about 43% of Victoria's electricity requirements and 10% of the National Electricity Market. Loy Yang also serves as the mainland connection point for the Basslink electricity interconnector cable which runs under Bass Strait, connecting it to the George Town sub-station in northern Tasmania.

In 2024, Loy Yang was named as a candidate site for the development of a nuclear power plant as part of then-opposition leader Peter Dutton's energy policy plans.

== Technical Features ==
All six Loy Yang boilers are of the forced circulation tower type and are made by International Combustion Australia. Steam is supplied at a pressure of 16 MPa and a temperature of 540 °C.

=== Loy Yang A ===
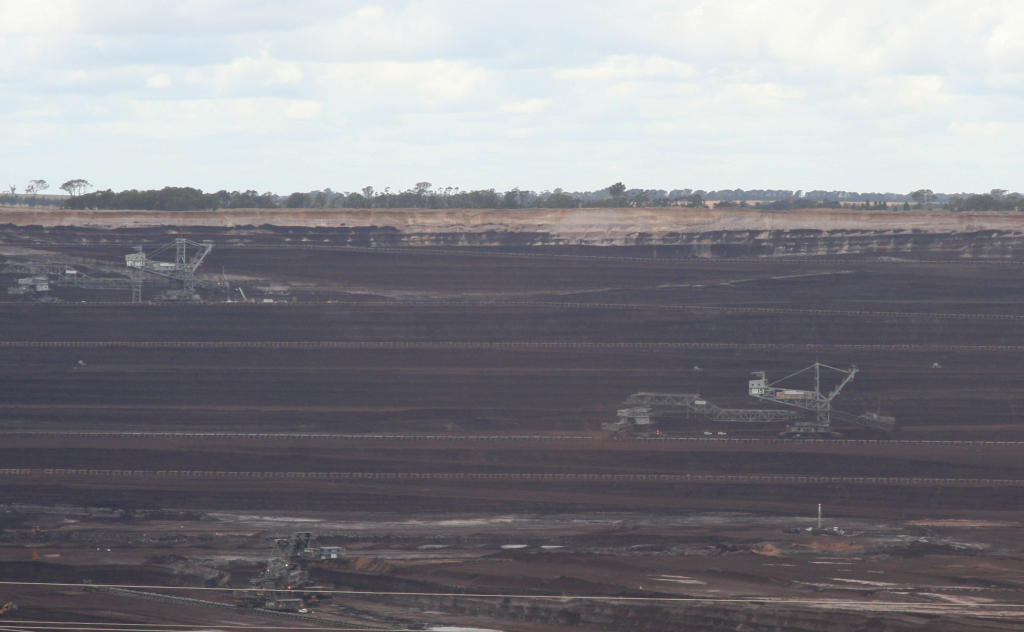
Two large dredges working coal face, and smaller unit on the mine floor

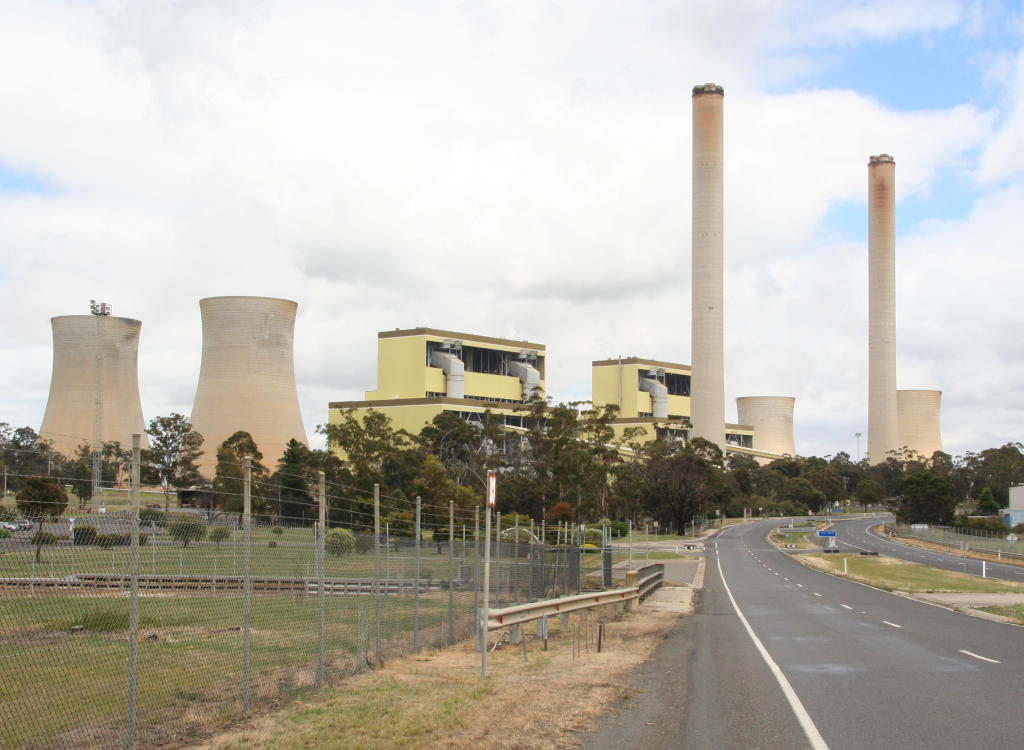
Loy Yang A

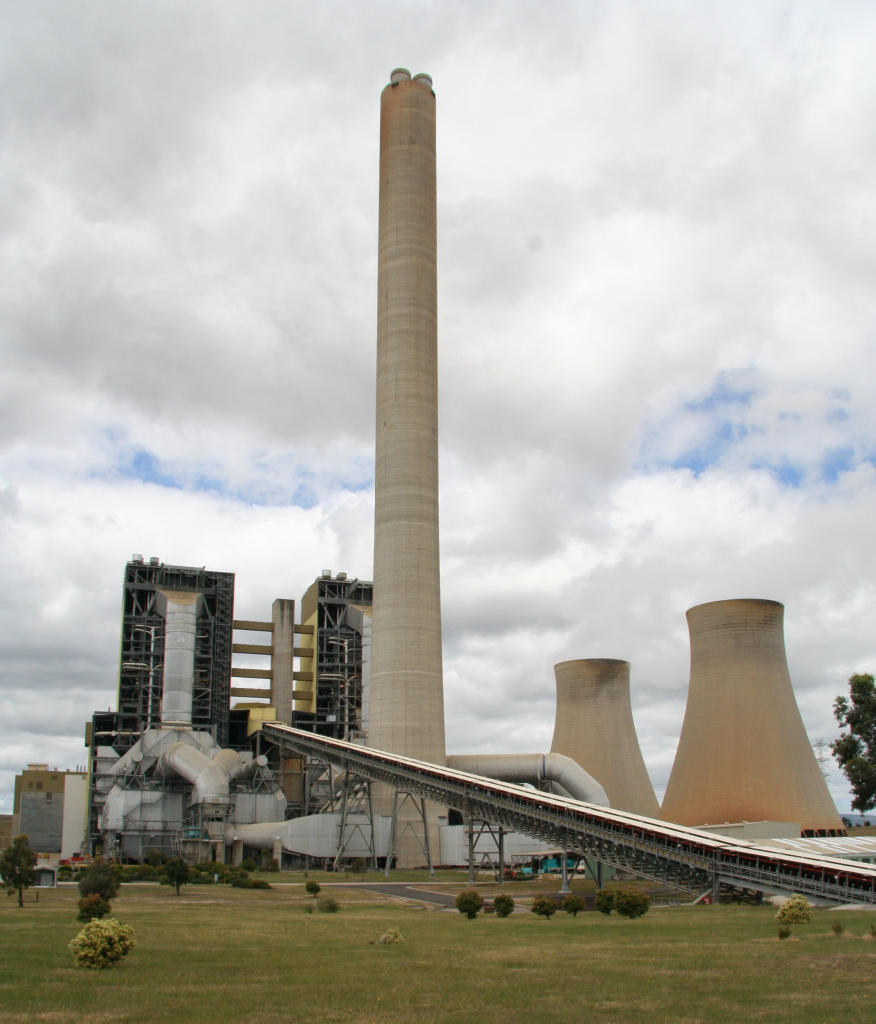
Loy Yang B

Loy Yang A has four generating units with a combined capacity of 2,210 MW (2,960,000 hp), which have been completed between 1984 and 1988. Loy Yang A consists of three units with Kraftwerk Union alternators (units 1, 3 and 4) and one unit by Brown Boveri & Cie (unit 2) that was supposed to be the second unit at the gas-fired Newport Power Station. Later during the 2000s the turbine/generator couplings were upgraded on the 3 Kraftwerk Union units to allow an increase in MCR to 560 MW. Loy Yang A is the mainland connection point for the Basslink electricity interconnector cable.

=== Loy Yang B ===
Loy Yang B has two units with a combined capacity of 953 MW (1,278,000 hp) which entered service in 1993 and 1996. The two units have Hitachi turbo generators.

Loy Yang B employs up to 152 full-time staff and another 40 contractors. It is Victoria's newest and most efficient brown coal-fired power station and can generate approximately 17% of Victoria's power needs.

== Fuel supply ==
Four giant bucket-wheel excavators, called dredgers, operate 24 hours a day in the Loy Yang open cut mine, mostly feeding coal directly to the boilers via conveyor belt, 18 hours of reserve supply is held in a 70,000 tonnes (69,000 long tons) coal bunker. Each year approximately 30 million tonnes (30×10^{6} long tons) of coal are extracted from the open pit. The open cut coal mine pit is about 200 metres (660 ft) deep, 3 kilometres (1.9 mi) and 2 kilometres (1.2 mi) wide at its widest. The current mining licence has been extended by the Victorian Government up to the year 2065.

== History ==
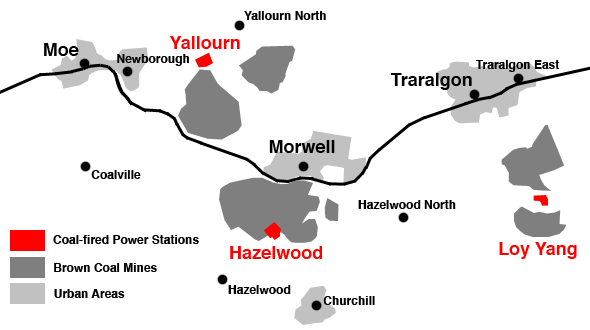
A map of the major towns and coal-fired power stations in the Latrobe Valley

The squatter James Rintoul established a stock run in the 1840s at the place where Sheepwash Creek meets the Latrobe River, which he called "Loy Yang", an Aboriginal name meaning "Big Eel".

Loy Yang facility was originally constructed through the 1980s by International Combustion Australia, who was contracted by the government-owned State Electricity Commission of Victoria (SECV). It consists of two separate units, Loy Yang A and Loy Yang B. Constructed in stages, it was originally planned that the Loy Yang complex would consist of eight generating units, of 525 megawatts (704,000 hp) each upon completion. The privatization of the SECV resulted in only six generating units being completed, four in Loy Yang A and two in Loy Yang B. The chimneys were constructed by Thiess Contractors.

In 1992, the Labor government sold a 51% stake of Loy Yang B to Mission Energy. Later Edison Mission bought the complete plant, and later again sold it to the joint venture International Power Mitsui. The Loy Yang complex was privatised in 1995, as were most of the assets of the SECV.

In 1995, Loy Yang B was the world's first coal-fired power station to gain quality accreditation to ISO 9001 and the first Australian power station to gain environmental accreditation to ISO 14001.

In March 2010, it was announced that the operators of Loy Yang A (Loy Yang Power) signed a contract with Alcoa World Alumina & Chemicals Australia for the supply of electricity to power aluminium smelters at Portland and Point Henry until 2036. The Point Henry Smelter ceased operation in 2014 and is now closed.

In June 2012, AGL Energy acquired Loy Yang A and the Loy Yang coal mine. In 2020, AGL announced plans to build a 200 MW / 800 MWh (4 hours) battery storage power station at Loy Yang A to increase flexibility.

Until November 2017, Loy Yang B was jointly owned by Engie (formerly GDF Suez Australia), which held a 70% stake, and Mitsui & Co with 30%. In November 2017, Engie sold Loy Yang B to Chow Tai Fook Enterprises for a reported AU$1.2 billion, despite some reported that it was acquired by Chow Tai Fook Enterprises' subsidiary Alinta Energy instead.

In February 2024, all four units at Loy Yang A shut down after two transmission lines collapsed, while Loy Yang B continued operation. Wholesale power prices soared to the market cap at $16.6/kWh.

== Greenhouse gas emissions ==
Carbon Monitoring for Action estimates this power station emits 14.4 million tonnes (14.2×10^{6} long tons) of greenhouse gases each year as a result of burning coal. On 3 September 2007 the Loy Yang complex was the target of climate change activists. The activists locked themselves to conveyor belts and reduced power production for several hours before being cut free. Four people were arrested.

On 23 September 2021, Environment Victoria took legal action against AGL Energy, which owns Loy Yang A (and also EnergyAustralia, owner of Yallourn power station, and Alinta at Loy Yang B) for failure to manage climate pollution, in a case that was the first to test the Victorian government’s climate change laws.

== Engineering heritage award ==
The power station received an Engineering Heritage Marker from Engineers Australia as part of its Engineering Heritage Recognition Program.

== Future ==
In September 2022, AGL announced that Loy Yang A would close in 2035.

Alinta Energy, the owner of Loy Yang B, has announced an intention to operate it until 2047. However, the state government has announced a target that 95% of Victoria's electricity will be generated by renewable energy by 2035. It would be impossible to meet this target if Loy Yang B continued to operate in its present form. The ex-Premier of Victoria, Daniel Andrews, has stated that it is unlikely to operate to the previously announced closure date.
