= Refining (metallurgy) =

Process of purifying metals

In metallurgy, refining consists of purifying an impure metal. It is to be distinguished from other processes such as smelting and calcining in that those two involve a chemical change to the raw material, whereas in refining the final material is chemically identical to the raw material. Refining thus increases the purity of the raw material via processing. There are many processes including pyrometallurgical and hydrometallurgical techniques.

== Lead ==
=== Cupellation ===
One ancient process for extracting the silver from lead was cupellation. This process involved melting impure lead samples in a cupel, a small porous container designed for purification that would aid in the oxidation process, while being able to withstand the heat needed to melt these metals in a furnace. This reaction would oxidize the lead to litharge, along with any other impurities present, whereas the silver would not get oxidized.

In the 18th century, the process was carried on using a kind of reverberatory furnace, but differing from the usual kind in that air was blown over the surface of the molten lead from bellows or (in the 19th century) blowing cylinders.

=== Pattinson Process ===
The Pattinson process was patented by its inventor, Hugh Lee Pattinson, in 1833 who described it as, "An improved method for separating silver from lead". It exploited the fact that in molten lead (containing traces of silver), the first metal to solidify out of the liquid is lead, leaving the remaining liquid richer in silver. Pattinson's equipment consisted a row of up to 13 iron pots, each heated from below. Some lead, naturally containing a small percentage of silver, was loaded into the central pot and melted. This was then allowed to cool. As the lead solidified it is removed using large, perforated iron ladles and moved to the next pot in one direction, and the remaining metal which was now richer in silver was then transferred to the next pot in the opposite direction. The process was repeated from one pot to the next, the lead accumulating in the pot at one end and metal enriched in silver in the pot at the other. The level of enrichment possible is limited by the lead-silver eutectic and typically the process stopped around 600 to 700 ounces per ton (approx. 2%), so further separation is carried out by cupellation.

The process was economic for lead containing at least 250 grams of silver per ton.

=== Parkes Process ===
The Parkes process, patented in 1850 by Alexander Parkes, uses molten zinc. Zinc is not miscible with lead and when the two molten metals are mixed, the zinc separates and floats to the top with ~2% lead. However, silver dissolves more easily in zinc, so the upper layer of zinc carries a significant portion of the silver. The melt is then cooled until the zinc solidifies and the dross is skimmed off. The silver is then recovered by volatilizing the zinc. The Parkes process largely replaced the Pattinson process, except where the lead contained insufficient silver. In such a case, the Pattinson process provided a method to enrich it in silver to about 40 to 60 ounces per ton, at which concentration it could be treated using the Parkes process.

== Copper ==
=== Fire refining ===
The initial product of copper smelting was impure "blister" copper, which contained sulfur and oxygen. To remove these impurities, the blister copper was repeatedly melted and solidified, undergoing a cycle of oxidation and reduction. In one of the previous melting stages, lead was added. Gold and silver preferentially dissolved in this, thus providing a means of recovering these precious metals. To produce purer copper suitable for making copper plates or hollow-ware, further melting processes were undertaken, using charcoal as fuel. The repeated application of such fire-refining processes was capable of producing copper that was 98.5-99.5% pure.

=== Electrolytic refining ===
The purest copper is obtained by an electrolytic process, undertaken using a slab of impure copper as the anode and a thin sheet of pure copper as the cathode. The electrolyte is an acidic solution of copper (II) sulfate. By passing electricity through the cell, copper is dissolved from the anode and deposited on the cathode. However, impurities either remain in solution or collect as an insoluble sludge. This process only became possible following the invention of the dynamo; it was first used in South Wales in 1869.

== Iron ==
=== Wrought iron ===
The product of the blast furnace is pig iron, which contains 4–5% carbon and usually some silicon. To produce a forgeable product, a further process was needed (usually described as fining, rather than refining). From the 16th century, this was undertaken in a finery forge. At the end of the 18th century, this began to be replaced by puddling (in a puddling furnace), which was in turn gradually superseded by the production of mild steel by the Bessemer process.

=== Refined iron ===
The term refining is used in a narrower context. Henry Cort's original puddling process only worked where the raw material was white cast iron, rather than the grey pig iron that was the usual raw material for finery forges. To use grey pig iron, a preliminary refining process was necessary to remove silicon. The pig iron was melted in a running out furnace and then run out into a trough. This process oxidized the silicon to form a slag, which floated on the iron and was removed by lowering a dam at the end of the trough. The product of this process was a white metal, known as finers metal or refined iron.

== Precious metals ==
Precious metal refining is the separation of precious metals from noble-metalliferous materials. Examples of these materials include used catalysts, electronic assemblies, ores, or metal alloys.

=== Process ===
In order to isolate noble-metalliferous materials, pyrolysis and/or hydrolysis procedures are used. In pyrolysis, the noble-metalliferous products are released from the other materials by solidifying in a melt to become cinder and then poured off or oxidized. In hydrolysis, the noble-metalliferous products are dissolved either in aqua regia (consisting of hydrochloric acid and nitric acid) or in a hydrochloric acid and chlorine gas in solution. Subsequently, certain metals can be precipitated or reduced directly with a salt, gas, organic, and/or nitro hydrate connection. Afterwards, they go through cleaning stages or are recrystallized. The precious metals are separated from the metal salt by calcination. The noble-metalliferous materials are hydrolyzed first and thermally prepared (pyrolyzed) thereafter. The processes are better yielding when using catalysts that may sometimes contain precious metals themselves. When using catalysts, the recycling product is removed in each case and driven several times through the cycle.

== See also ==
- Mineral processing – Process of separating commercially valuable minerals from their ores
- Ore concentrate – Raw ore processed to concentrate the metal component
- List of alumina refineries

== Bibliography ==
- J. Day and R. F. Tylecote, The Industrial Revolution in Metals (The Institute of Metals, London 1991).
- Söderberg, A. 2011. Eyvind Skáldaspillir's silver - refining and standards in pre-monetary economies in the light of finds from Sigtuna and Gotland. Situne Dei 2011. Edberg, R. Wikström, A. (eds). Sigtuna.
- R. F. Tylecote, A history of metallurgy (Institute of materials, London 1992).
- Newcastle University: Hugh Lee Pattinson
