= Essential Services Commission (Victoria) =

The Essential Services Commission (ESC) is the economic regulator established by the state Government of Victoria, Australia to regulate prescribed essential utility services supplied by the Victorian electricity, gas, water, ports and rail freight industries and advise or report on aspects of the transport and statutory insurance sectors. In 2009, the commission assumed the administration of the Victorian Energy Efficiency Target scheme.

Economic regulation of Victoria's electricity and gas distribution networks transferred from the commission to the Australian Energy Regulator on 1 January 2009.

The ESC commenced operations as Victoria's independent economic regulator on 1 January 2002, subsuming the Office of the Regulator-General Victoria.
