= Anglesea Power Station =

Former brown coal power station in Australia

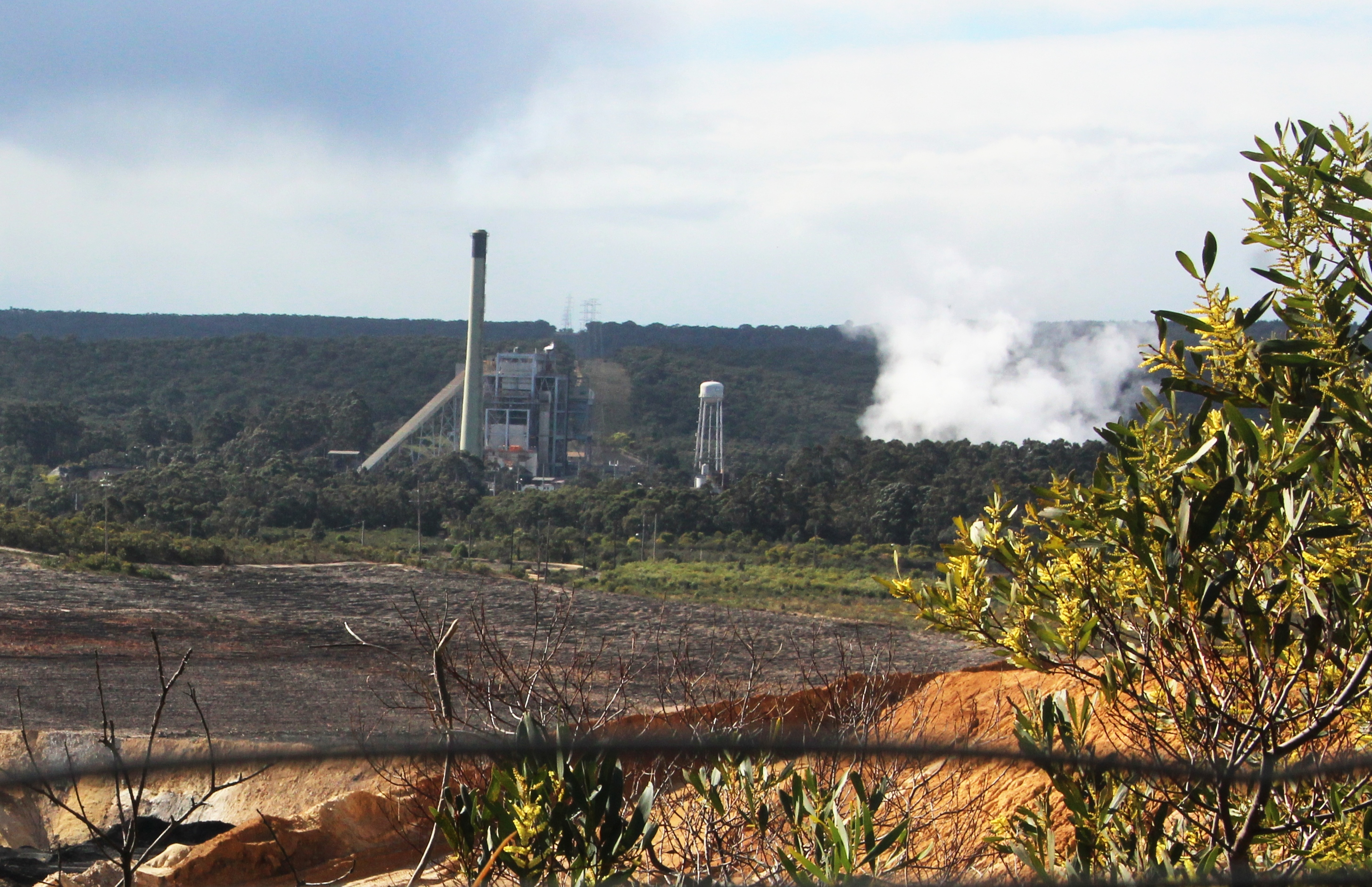
- The single steam turbine 150MW Anglesea power station. Photo: John Englart
- Country: Australia
- Location: Anglesea, Victoria
- Coordinates: 38°23′20.51″S 144°10′50.12″E
- Status: Closed
- Commission date: 20 March 1969
- Decommission date: 31 August 2015
- Owner: Alcoa
- Operator: Alcoa

Thermal power station
- Primary fuel: Brown coal

Power generation
- Units operational: 1 × 150 megawatts (200,000 hp)
- Nameplate capacity: 150 megawatts (200,000 hp)

External links
- Commons: Related media on Commons

The Anglesea Power Station was a brown coal–powered thermal power station located at Anglesea, in Victoria, Australia. The station had one steam turbine, with a capacity of 150 megawatts (200,000 hp). It was operated by Alcoa of Australia and supplied almost 40% of the electricity used by the company's Point Henry aluminium smelter, until the smelter's closure in August 2014.

The power station was brought online on 20 March 1969, and was supplied with brown coal from the adjacent open cut mine, transported to the power station along a 3-kilometre (1.9 mi)-long private road. Overburden was stripped and backfilled into the mined area by earthmoving contractors, using conventional power shovels and trucks. About 80 people worked at the mine and power station.

In June 2015, Alcoa announced that the power plant and mine would close at the end of August 2015, after the company was unable to find a buyer for the power station. On 31 August 2015, the plant ceased operation as planned. Mine rehabilitation, and plant decommissioning and demolition, have been carried out.

== History ==
In about 1955, test bores for coal were made at Anglesea by Roche Brothers, who were then operating a coal mine at nearby Wensleydale, where the reserves were dwindling. An extensive coal deposit was found two kilometres to the north of the Anglesea township, and mining commenced in 1959 to supply brown coal to industry and institutions in the Geelong area.

The mining rights were taken over by Western Mining Corporation (WMC) in 1961 to supply the power station planned by Alcoa of Australia. The Mines (Aluminum Agreement) Act of 1961 granted Alcoa a 50–year exclusive right to explore and mine over some 7,350 hectares (18,200 acres) of leasehold land in the region. After further drilling investigation, WMC relocated the mining operation to the east of the original mine, closer to the power station site and providing access to a larger coal reserve of 50 million long tons (51,000,000 t). The total thickness of the coal seams is about 140 metres (460 ft), with total economic mineable reserves estimated at 70 million long tons (71,000,000 t) in the upper seam, and a further 90 million long tons (91,000,000 t) in lower seams. In 1992, the overburden to coal ratio averaged around 2.5 to 1, with an average coal thickness of 27 metres (89 ft).

Following negotiation with the Victorian government in 2011, Alcoa took up a 50-year extension of the Agreement under the Mines (Aluminium Agreement) Act 1961, allowing for continued operation of the mine and power station until 2016. Alcoa outlined plans to expand the footprint of the mine by approximately 50 percent, taking the total disturbed area from approximately 400 to 600 hectares (990 to 1,480 acres), from about 2016.

As of 2005, approximately 35 million tonnes (34×10^{6} long tons) of coal had been mined, with about 1.1 million tonnes (1.1×10^{6} long tons) of brown coal being extracted annually to feed the power station that consumed 144 tonnes (142 long tons; 159 short tons) of pulverised brown coal an hour. The coal at Anglesea has a high quality heat value when compared to other brown coals used to produce electricity in Victoria, but has a much higher level of sulphur, at around 3%, resulting in high levels of sulfur dioxide (SO_{2}) being emitted. Carbon Monitoring for Action estimated that the power station emitted 1.21 million tonnes (1.19×10^{6} long tons) of greenhouse gases each year as a result of burning the coal. The Anglesea power station drew its cooling water from six sub-artesian well bores, supplemented with rainwater.

With the closure of the Point Henry Aluminium smelter, Alcoa applied for and was granted a licence in May 2014 by the Victorian Essential Services Commission to sell electricity to the national electricity market. In February 2014, an Alcoa spokesperson said that it was seeking sale options for the power station, which might be closed if a sale was not possible. In May 2015, Alcoa announced that it was unable to find a buyer for the plant, and would close it and the associated coal mine in August 2015. Closure occurred as planned on 31 August 2015.

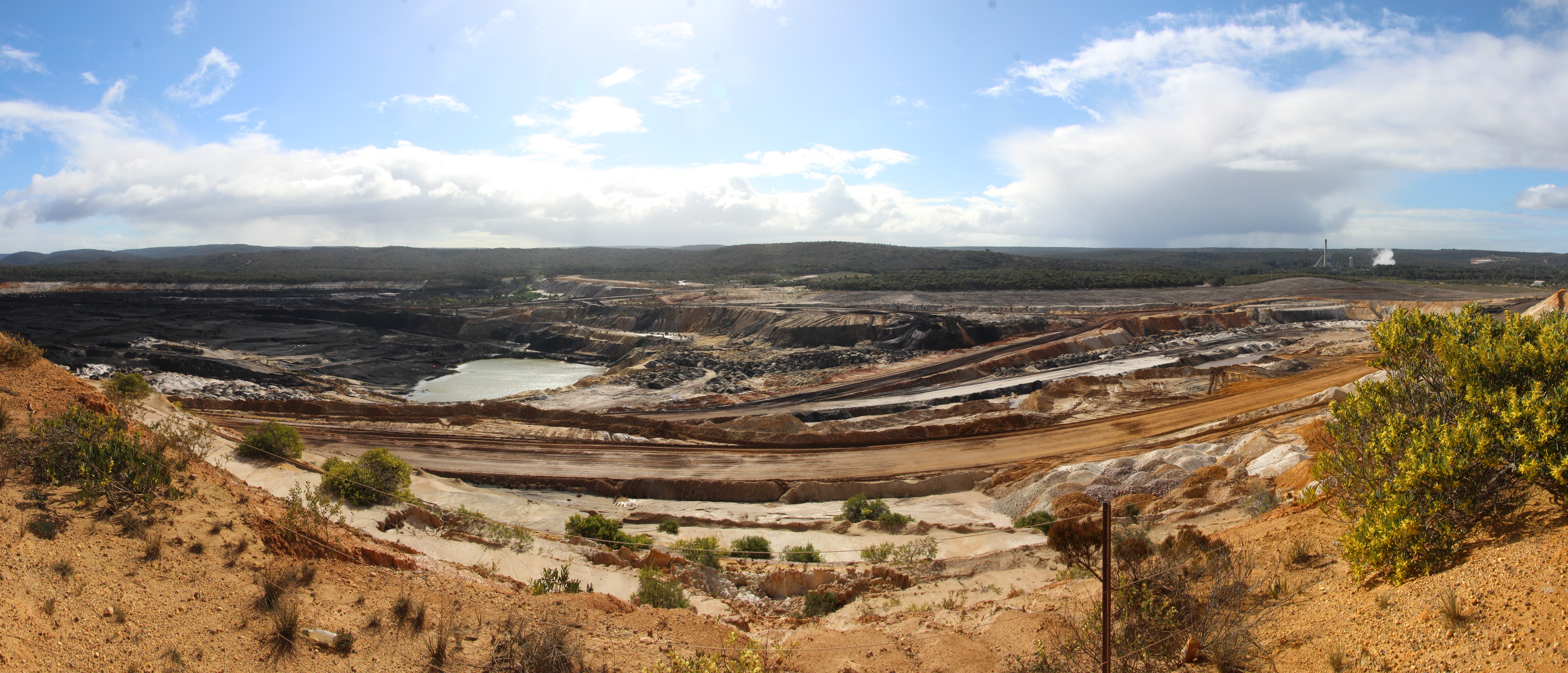
Panorama of the Anglesea open cut brown coal mine and power station. Photo by John Englart

== Criticism ==
Since 2011, Alcoa and the Anglesea power station had come under increasing local criticism, with residents forming the Surf Coast Air Action group concerned with health impacts of air pollution from the mine and power station. The group campaigned for reduced emissions from the power station and, following the closure of the Point Henry aluminium smelter, claimed that there was little justification for continuing the operation of the power station.

Alcoa rejected claims it had exceeded targets, saying it had met its worldwide targets for reducing sulphur dioxide emissions, although it did not dispute that Anglesea's SO2 emissions actually went up from a base figure of 32,899 tonnes (32,379 long tons; 36,265 short tons) to 39,000 tonnes (38,000 long tons; 43,000 short tons) in 2012-13.

In a December 2013 submission to the Essential Services Commission, Friends of the Earth Australia argued that Alcoa should not be granted a licence to directly sell power to the National Electricity Market for four reasons: no additional coal-fired power was needed, Alcoa has no social licence to operate in the energy market, local health concerns, and that continuing operation of the power station undermined efforts to tackle climate change.

Alcoa's licence to supply electricity to the grid was approved, although community groups said the decision lacked transparency and legitimacy, because no community consultation had been conducted by the Essential Services Commission.

=== Protests ===
Two major protests in Anglesea occurred in 2014 regarding the future of the coal mine and power station. In July, over 500 people made up a human sign on the Anglesea beach saying "Shut it Down". On 10 August 2014, several hundred people attended a rally and march calling for the coal mine and power station to be closed.

== See also ==
- List of power stations in Victoria
- State Electricity Commission of Victoria
