= Alcoa World Alumina and Chemicals =

Joint business venture

Alcoa World Alumina and Chemicals (AWAC) is a subsidiary of Alcoa. AWAC's business is the mining of bauxite, the extraction of alumina (aluminium oxide) and the smelting of aluminium. It has about 25% of the global alumina market.

== Australian operations ==
Alcoa has one smelter in Victoria in Portland. It has three alumina refineries in Western Australia, located at Kwinana Beach, Pinjarra and Wagerup, and two bauxite mines at Huntly and Willowdale, also in Western Australia.

=== Portland smelter ===
The Portland smelter produces about 360,000 tonnes of aluminium a year, and is Victoria's largest single exporter.

=== Point Henry smelter ===
The Point Henry smelter commenced full production on April 4, 1963. It has a production capacity of 185,000 tonnes of aluminium a year. March 20, 1969, saw Alcoa's own brown coal-fired Anglesea Power Station brought on line at augment the electricity supply from the Victorian grid. The Point Henry smelter closed in 2014.

== Other operations ==
AWAC has other operations in Brazil, Guinea, Jamaica, Suriname, Spain, and the USA

== See also ==
- Alumina
- Aluminium smelting
- Alcoa
- Alumina Limited
- Australian Aluminium Council
- List of Alumina Refineries
- List of aluminium smelters
- AWAC webpage
