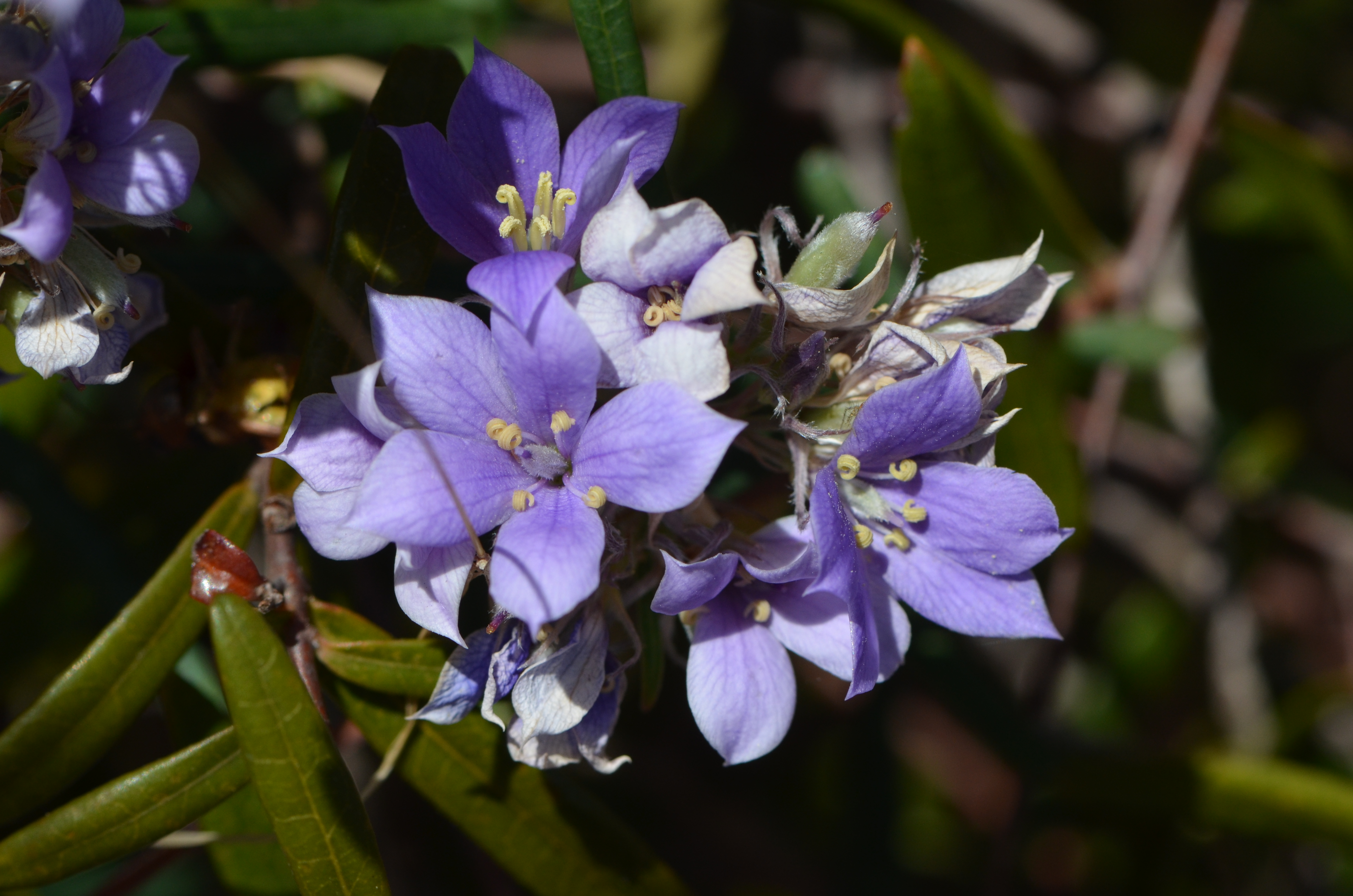
- In Kensington Bushland

Scientific classification
- Kingdom: Plantae
- Clade: Tracheophytes
- Clade: Angiosperms
- Clade: Eudicots
- Clade: Asterids
- Order: Apiales
- Family: Pittosporaceae
- Genus: Billardiera
- Species: B. fraseri

Binomial name
- Billardiera fraseri (Hook.) L.W.Cayzer, Crisp & I.Telford
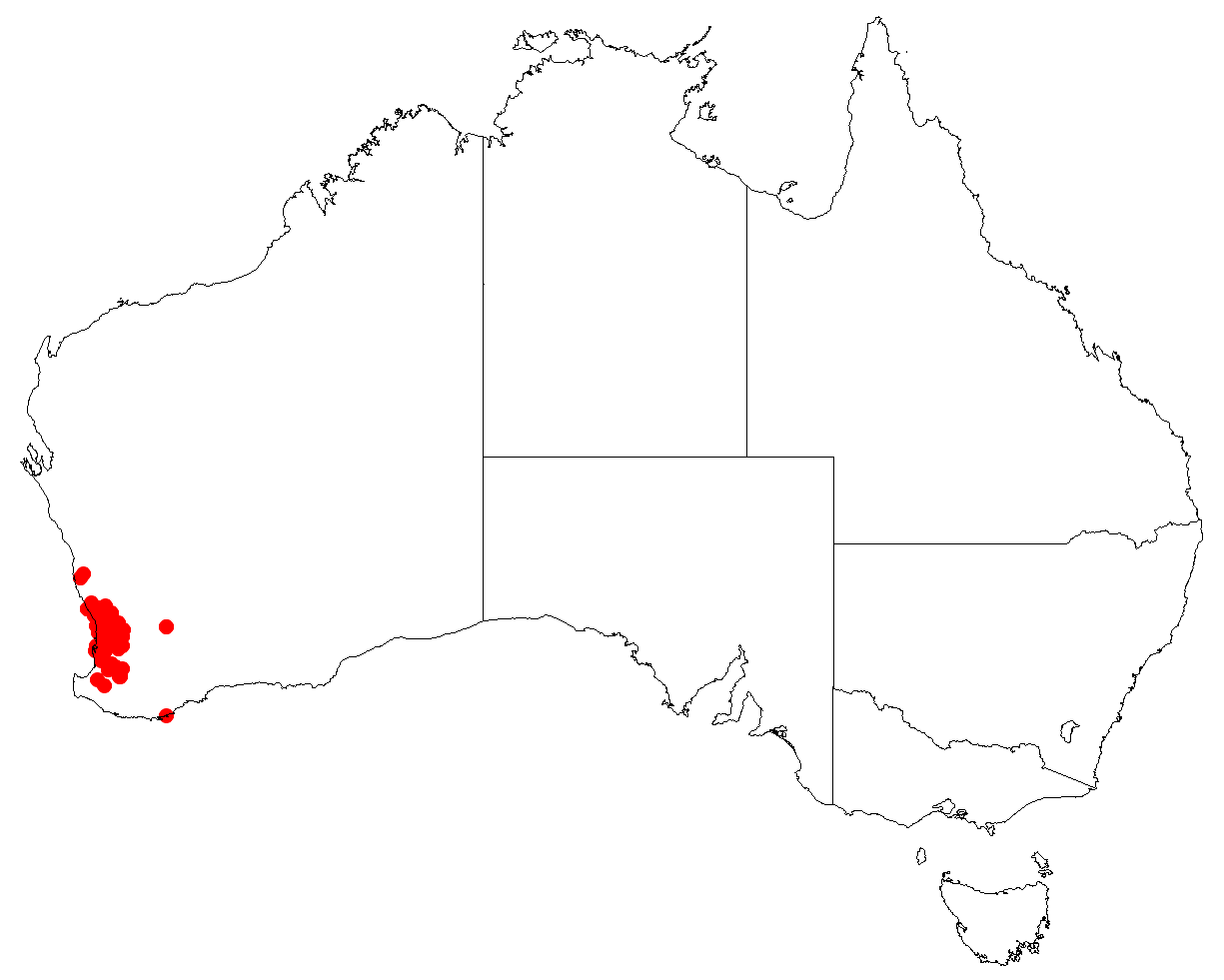
- Occurrence data from AVH

Synonyms
- Billardiera elegans (Hügel ex Endl.) F.Muell. nom. superfl.; Campylanthera fraseri (Hook.) Hook.; Pronaya elegans Hügel ex Endl.; Pronaya elegans Hügel isonym; Pronaya elegans Hügel var. elegans; Pronaya fraseri (Hook.) E.M.Benn.; Pronaya fraseri (Hook.) E.M.Benn. var. fraseri; Spiranthera fraseri Hook.

= Billardiera fraseri =

Species of flowering plant

Billardiera fraseri, commonly known as elegant pronaya, is a species of flowering plant in the family Pittosporaceae and is endemic to the south-west of Western Australia. It is a climber with densely silky-hairy new shoots, leaves and flowers, narrowly elliptic leaves and deep purple or pink flowers arranged in groups.

== Description ==
Billardiera fraseri is a climber with densely silky-hairy new shoots, leaves and flowers. The adult leaves are narrowly elliptic with the edges turned down, 22–28 mm (0.87–1.10 in) long and 3–5 mm (0.12–0.20 in) wide and sessile. The flowers are arranged in sessile groups with leaf-like bracts 7–9 mm (0.28–0.35 in) long at the base. The sepals are narrowly triangular, 6–12 mm (0.24–0.47 in) long and the petals are deep purple or pink, fading as they age, 12–16 mm (0.47–0.63 in) long and spatula-shaped. Flowering occurs from December to February and the mature fruit is a cylinderical berry about 20 mm (0.79 in) long.

== Taxonomy ==
Elegant pronaya was first formally described in 1836 by William Jackson Hooker who gave it the name Spiranthera fraseri in the Botanical Magazine from specimens collected in the Swan River Colony by Charles Fraser. In 2004, Lindy Cayzer, Michael Crisp and Ian Telford transferred the species to Ballardiera as B. fraseri in Australian Systematic Botany. The specific epithet (fraseri) honours the collector of the type specimen.

== Distribution and habitat ==
Billardiera fraseri grows on the coastal plain and cliffs on limestone, sand and gravel from near Yanchep and Muchea to North Bannister in the Avon Wheatbelt, Geraldton Sandplains, Jarrah Forest and Swan Coastal Plain bioregions of south-western Western Australia.
