= Billardiera rubens =

Scientific classification
- Kingdom: Plantae
- Clade: Tracheophytes
- Clade: Angiosperms
- Clade: Eudicots
- Clade: Asterids
- Order: Apiales
- Family: Pittosporaceae
- Genus: Billardiera
- Species: B. rubens

Binomial name
- Billardiera rubens L.W.Cayzer, Crisp & Telford
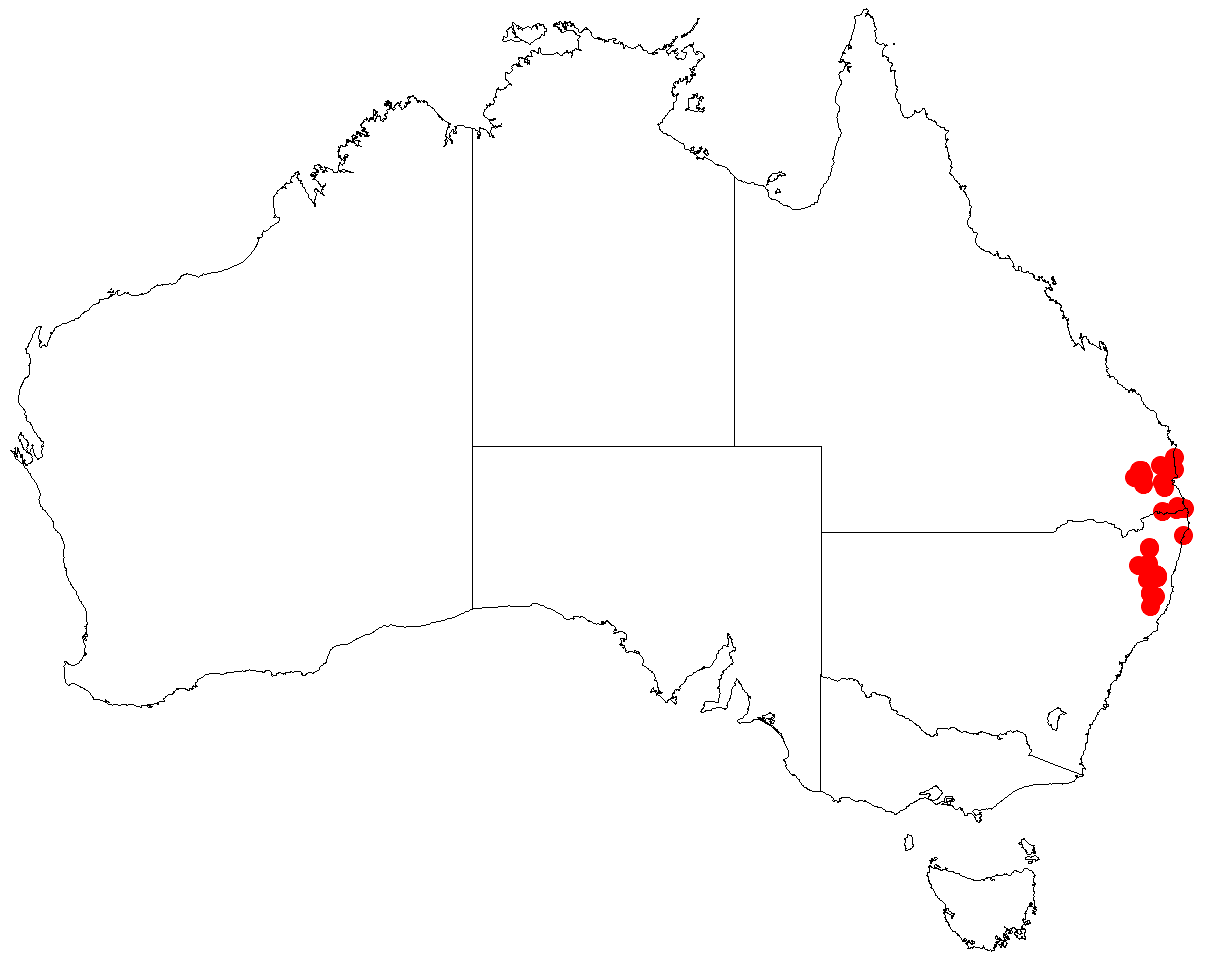
- Occurrence data from Australasian Virtual Herbarium

Species of flowering plant

Billardiera rubens is a species of flowering plant in the family Pittosporaceae and is endemic to eastern Australia. It is a vigorous climber that has narrowly egg-shaped leaves and pendent yellow flowers with a reddish tinge on the edges.

== Description ==
Billardiera rubens is a vigorous climber or twiner that has silky-hairy new shoots. The adult leaves are narrowly egg-shaped with the narrower end towards the base, 35–60 mm (1.4–2.4 in) long and 5–10 mm (0.20–0.39 in) wide on a petiole up to 2 mm (0.079 in) long. The flowers are arranged singly in leaf exils on a slender, down-curved pedicel 10–20 mm (0.39–0.79 in) long. The sepals are egg-shaped 3–6 mm (0.12–0.24 in) long but of different sizes, even on the one flower. The petals are yellow with a pinkish-red tinge, and 13–18 mm (0.51–0.71 in) long. Flowering has been observed in early spring and the mature fruit is an oblong berry up to 20 mm (0.79 in) long.

== Taxonomy ==
Billardiera rubens was first formally described in 2004 by Lindy Cayzer, Michael Crisp and Ian Telford in Australian Systematic Botany from specimens collected in the New England National Park in 1999. The specific epithet (rubens) means "blushed with red or ruddy", referring to the tinge of the flowers and the colour change as they age.

== Distribution and habitat ==
Billardiera rubens usually grows in open forest and disturbed sites and is found in south-eastern Queensland and north-eastern New South Wales.
