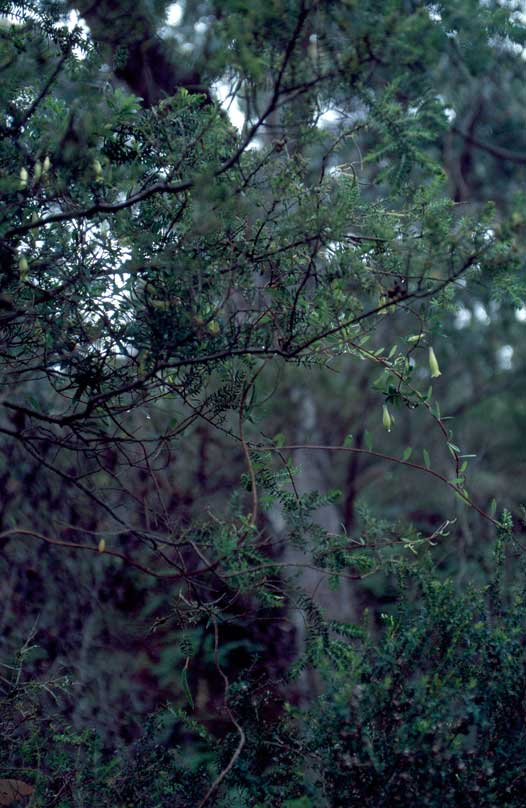
- On South Bruny Island

Scientific classification
- Kingdom: Plantae
- Clade: Tracheophytes
- Clade: Angiosperms
- Clade: Eudicots
- Clade: Asterids
- Order: Apiales
- Family: Pittosporaceae
- Genus: Billardiera
- Species: B. nesophila

Binomial name
- Billardiera nesophila L.W.Cayzer & D.L.Jones
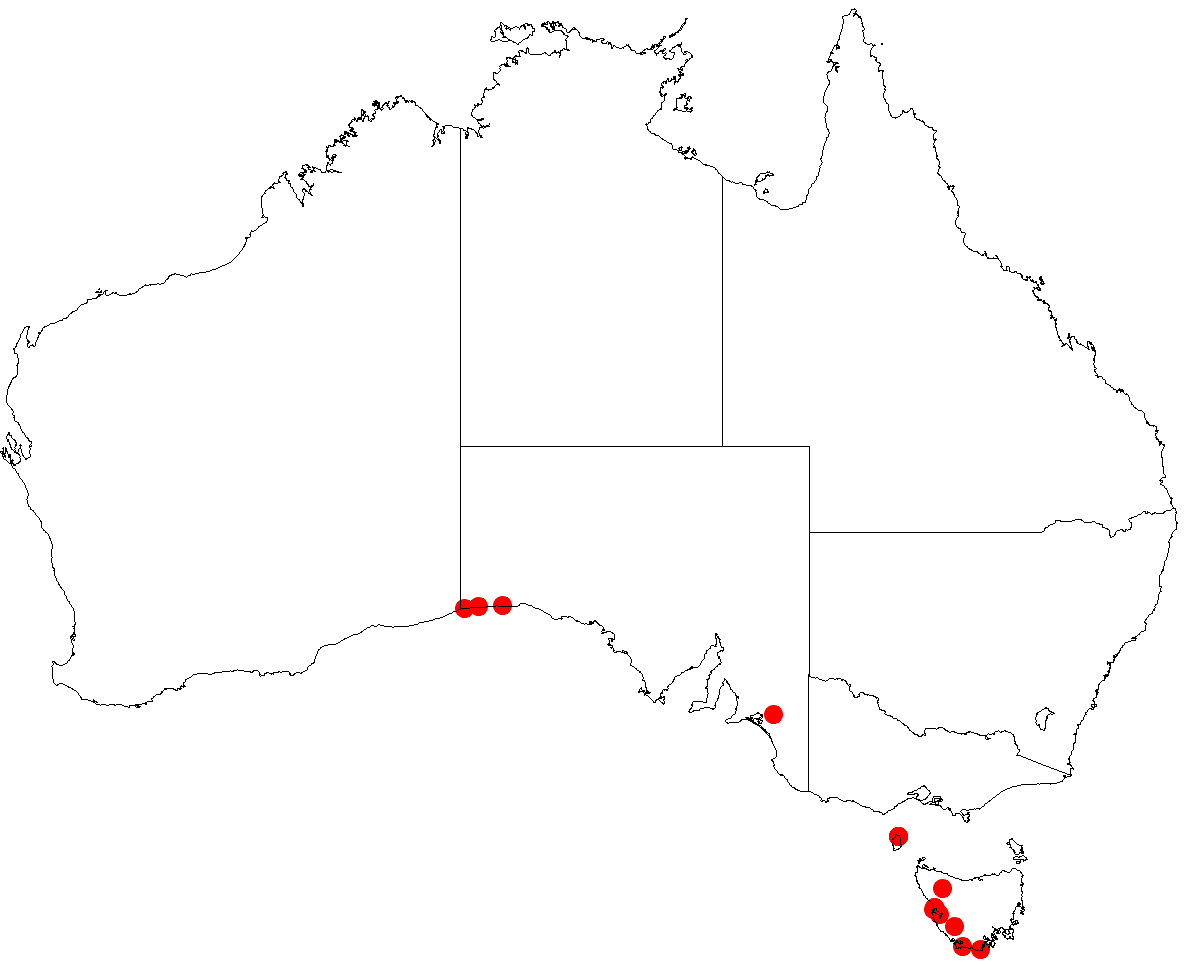
- Occurrence data from Australasian Virtual Herbarium

= Billardiera nesophila =

Species of flowering plant

Billardiera nesophila is a species of flowering plant in the family Pittosporaceae and is endemic to Tasmania. It is a slender, twining shrub that has narrowly elliptic leaves and pendent yellowish-green flowers that turn canary yellow as they age.

== Description ==
Billardiera nesophila is a slender twining shrub that sometimes climbs to a height of 5 m (16 ft). The adult leaves are narrowly elliptic, 24–53 mm (0.94–2.09 in) long and 4–8 mm (0.16–0.31 in) wide on a petiole 2–5 mm (0.079–0.197 in) long. The upper surface of the leaves is glossy green, the lower surface paler, and the edges of the leaves are turned slightly downwards. The flowers are arranged singly on slender, down-turned peduncles up to 35 mm (1.4 in) long. The sepals are egg-shaped, pinkish-mauve and joined at the base, the lobes up to 4 mm (0.16 in) long. The petals are yellowish-green, turning canary yellow as they age, 25–30 mm (0.98–1.18 in) long, the petal lobes spatula-shaped and spreading. Flowering occurs in spring and the mature fruit is a glossy, bluish-purple berry less than 15 mm (0.59 in) long, containing many seeds.

== Taxonomy ==
Billardiera nesophila was first formally described in 2004 by Lindy W. Cayzer and David L. Jones in Australian Systematic Botany from specimens collected near Lavinia State Reserve on King Island in 1998. The specific epithet (nesophila) means "island-loving".

== Distribution and habitat ==
This species of billardiera grows in shady woodland in coastal areas of western Tasmania, and on islands south from King Island.`
