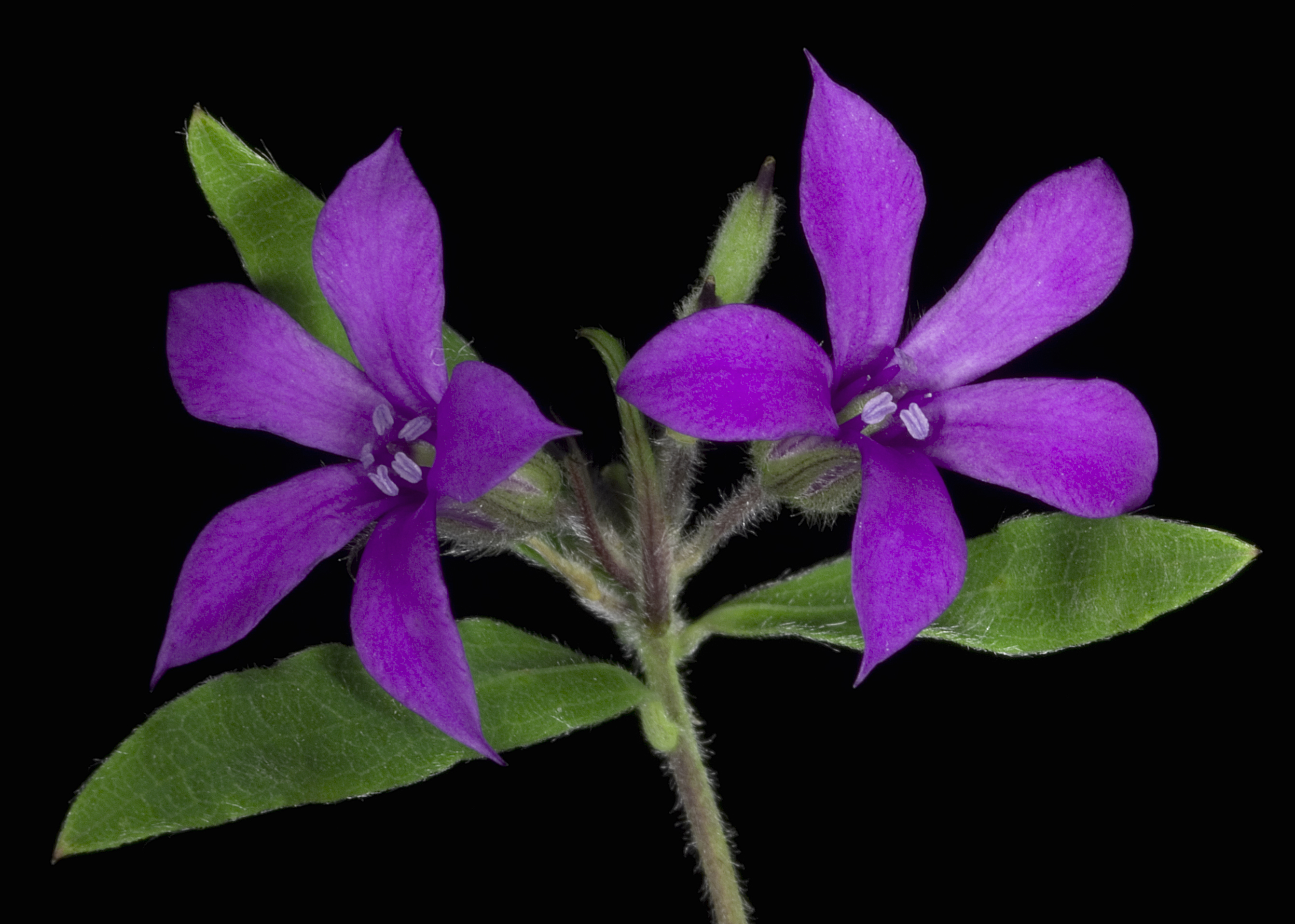

Scientific classification
- Kingdom: Plantae
- Clade: Tracheophytes
- Clade: Angiosperms
- Clade: Eudicots
- Clade: Asterids
- Order: Apiales
- Family: Pittosporaceae
- Genus: Billardiera
- Species: B. variifolia

Binomial name
- Billardiera variifolia DC.
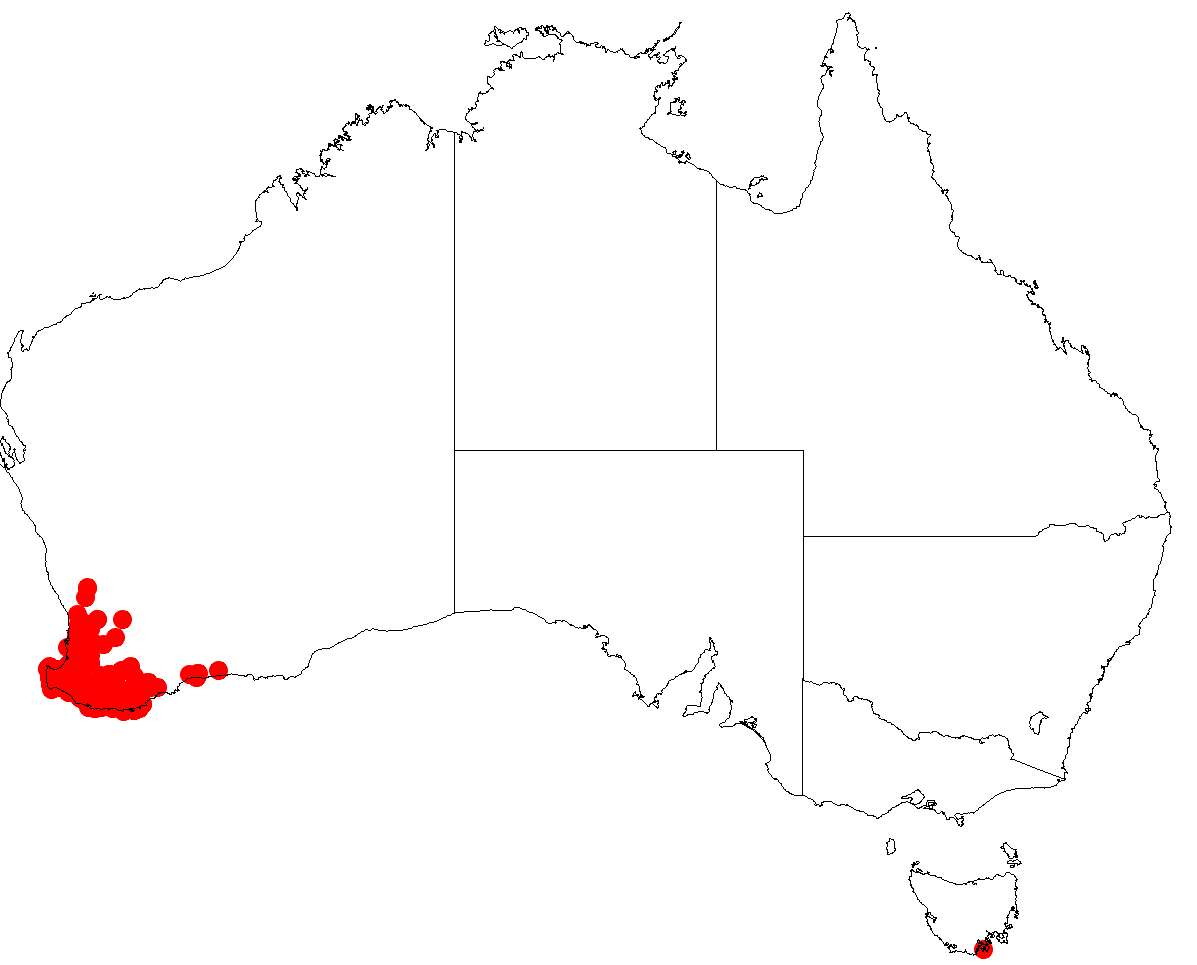
- Occurrence data from Australasian Virtual Herbarium

= Billardiera variifolia =

Species of shrub endemic to South Australia

Billardiera variifolia is a species of flowering plant in the family Pittosporaceae and is endemic to the southwest of Western Australia. It is a twining shrub or climber with elliptic adult leaves and groups of deep purple flowers that fade to blue as they age.

== Description ==
Billardiera variifolia is twining shrub or climber that typically grows to a height of up to 2.5 m (8 ft 2 in) and has both seedling, intermediate and adult leaves on the same plant. Its seedling leaves are egg-shaped and irregularly lobed or toothed, 20–25 mm (0.79–0.98 in) long and 9–11 mm (0.35–0.43 in) wide. Adult leaves are narrowly elliptic, 15–20 mm (0.59–0.79 in) long, 3–4 mm (0.12–0.16 in) wide, sessile and have wavy edges. The flowers are arranged in groups with densely shaggy-hairy, sepal-like bracts 2 mm (0.079 in) long at the base. The sepals are 4.0–5.5 mm (0.16–0.22 in) long, green with purple streaks and shaggy-hairy. The petals are deep purple, fading to blue as they age, spatula-shaped and 10–15 mm (0.39–0.59 in) long. Flowering occurs in from October to December or from January to May and the mature fruit is a spindle-shaped berry 20–24 mm (0.79–0.94 in) long.

== Taxonomy ==
Billardiera variifolia was formally described in 1824 by Augustin Pyramus de Candolle in his Prodromus Systematis Naturalis Regni Vegetabilis. The specific epithet (variifolia) means "changeable-leaved".

== Distribution and habitat ==
This species grows in open woodland, often near creeks and in gullies, often with Billardiera drummondii and is found in the Avon Wheatbelt, Esperance Plains, Jarrah Forest, Swan Coastal Plain and Warren bioregions of south-western Western Australia, especially in the Albany and Stirling Ranges areas.
