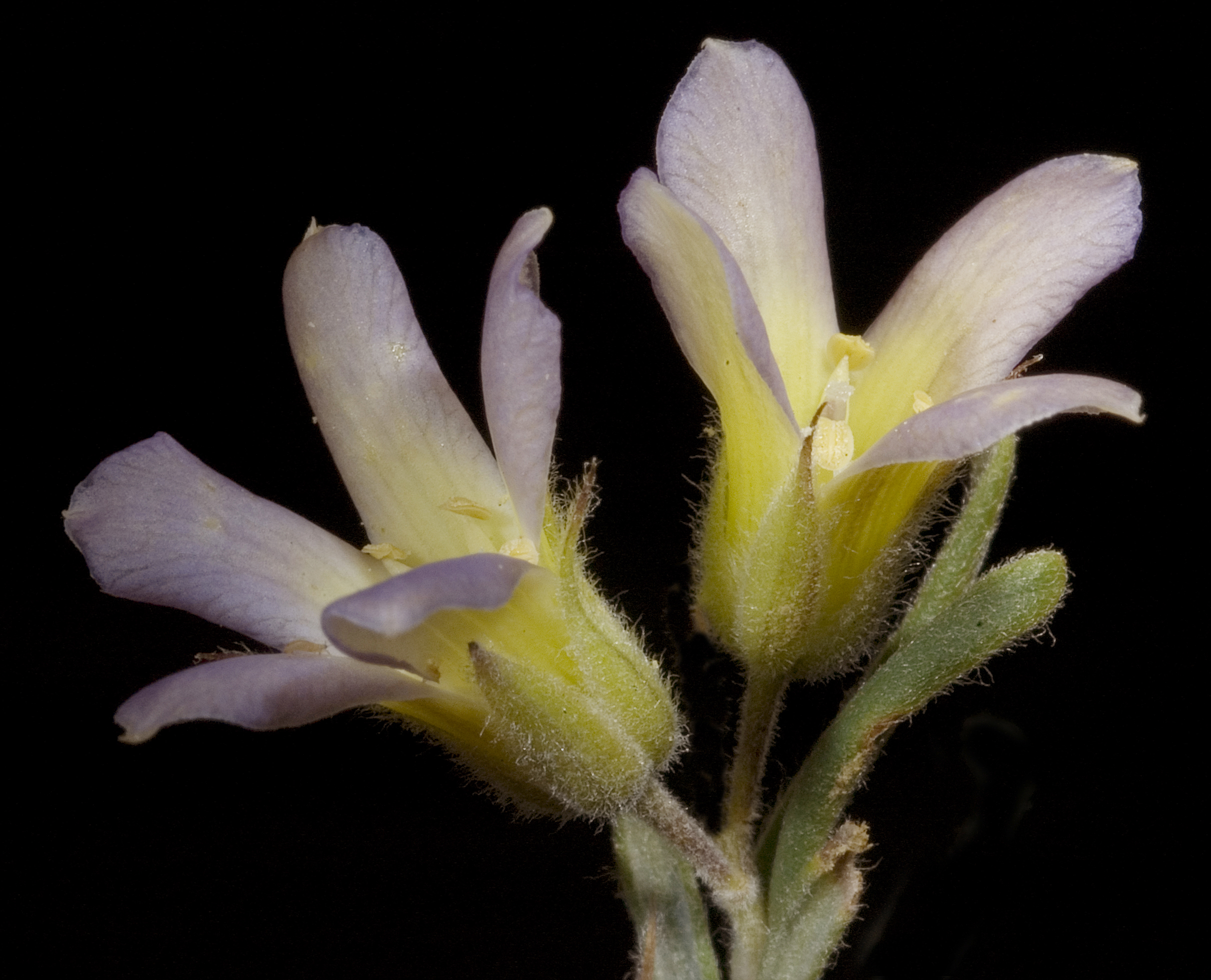

Scientific classification
- Kingdom: Plantae
- Clade: Tracheophytes
- Clade: Angiosperms
- Clade: Eudicots
- Clade: Asterids
- Order: Apiales
- Family: Pittosporaceae
- Genus: Billardiera
- Species: B. venusta

Binomial name
- Billardiera venusta (Putt.) L.W.Cayzer & Crisp
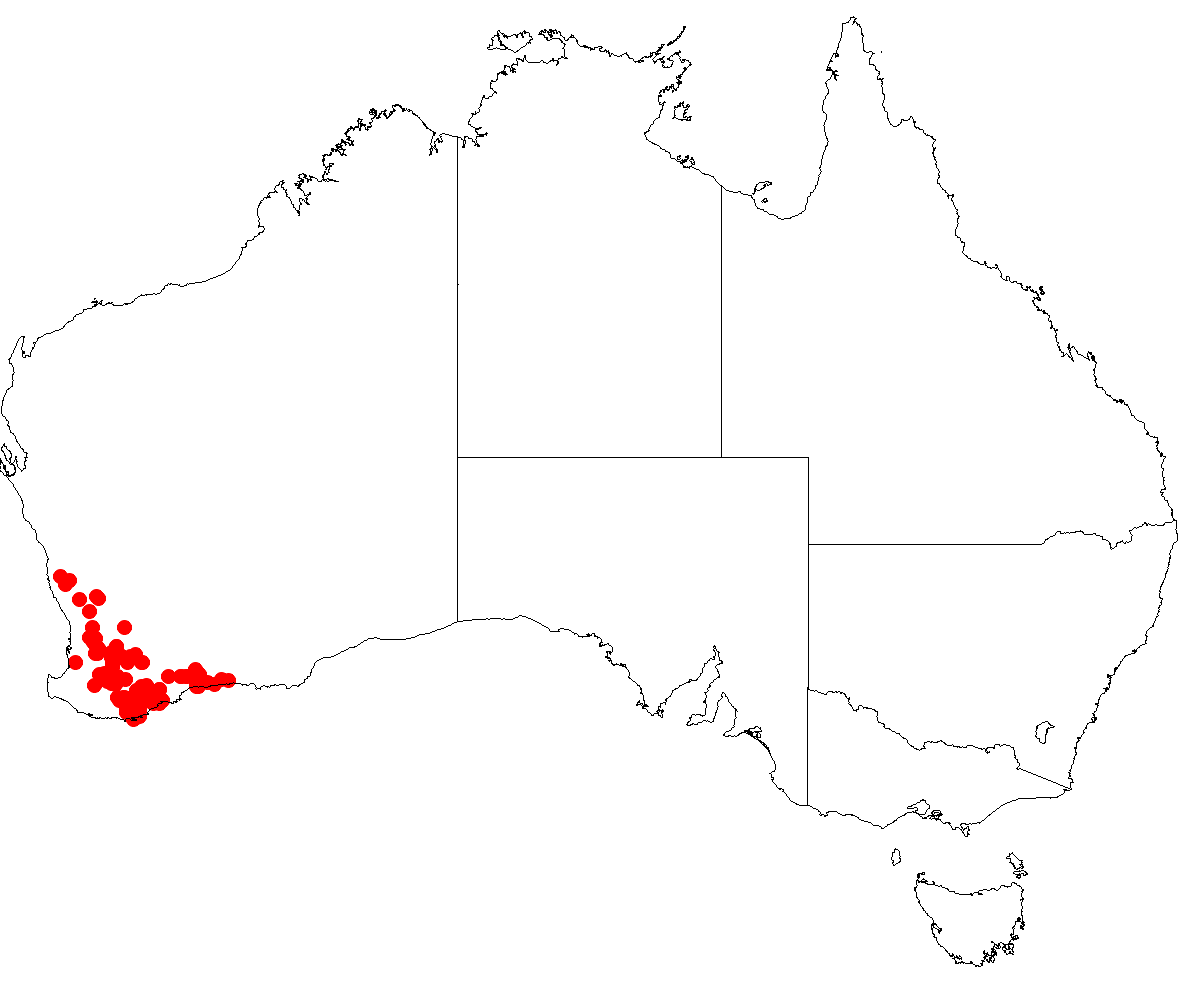
- Occurrence data from AVH

Synonyms
- Billardiera variifolia var. rigida Benth.; Marianthus venustus Putt.

= Billardiera venusta =

Species of flowering plant

Billardiera venusta is a species of flowering plant in the family Pittosporaceae and is endemic to the southwest of Western Australia. It is a woody climber or shrub with clustered sessile, hooked leaves and groups of four to six pale lilac flowers that fade to yellow as they age.

== Description ==
Billardiera venusta is woody climber or shrub that has both short side shoots with shaggy grey hairs. Its adult leaves are clustered, sessile and hooked, 10–20 mm (0.39–0.79 in) long, 1–2 mm (0.039–0.079 in) wide, sessile leaves with the edges rolled under. The flowers are arranged in groups of four to six on a peduncle 5–6 mm (0.20–0.24 in) long, the individual flowers sessile. The sepals are free from each other, 4.0–5.5 mm (0.16–0.22 in) long and shaggy hairy on both sides. The petals are yellow on the outside, lilac fading to yellow on the inside as they age, and 7.5–10 mm (0.30–0.39 in) long. Flowering occurs from December to February and the mature fruit is a curved, cylindrical berry 20–25 mm (0.79–0.98 in) long.

== Taxonomy ==
This species was first formally described in 1839 by Alois (Aloys) Putterlick who gave it the name Marianthus venustus in Synopsis Pittosporearum. In 2004, Lindy Cayzer and Michael Crisp transferred it to the genus Marianthus as M. venusta. The specific epithet (venusta ) means "beautiful" or "graceful".

== Distribution and habitat ==
This species grows in woodland and mallee between Gillingarra and Esperance in the Avon Wheatbelt, Esperance Plains, Jarrah Forest, Geraldton Sandplains, Mallee, Swan Coastal Plain and Warren bioregions of south-western Western Australia.
