= B. floribunda =

B. floribunda may refer to:

- Bacopa floribunda, an aquatic plant
- Baeckea floribunda, a plant with oppositely arranged leaves
- Baissea floribunda, a tropical plant
- Berberis floribunda, a deciduous shrub
- Billardiera floribunda, a plant endemic to Australia
- Brachystegia floribunda, a tree native to tropical Africa
- Buddleja floribunda, a plant native to the Americas
