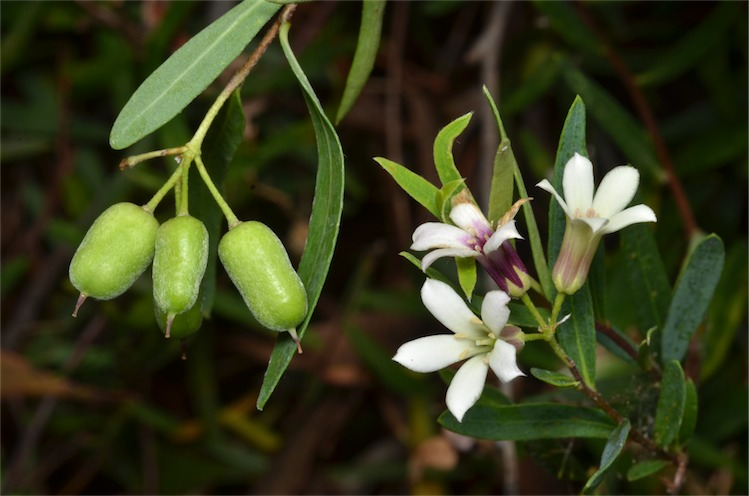
- In the Australian National Botanic Gardens

Scientific classification
- Kingdom: Plantae
- Clade: Tracheophytes
- Clade: Angiosperms
- Clade: Eudicots
- Clade: Asterids
- Order: Apiales
- Family: Pittosporaceae
- Genus: Billardiera
- Species: B. cymosa

Binomial name
- Billardiera cymosa F.Muell.
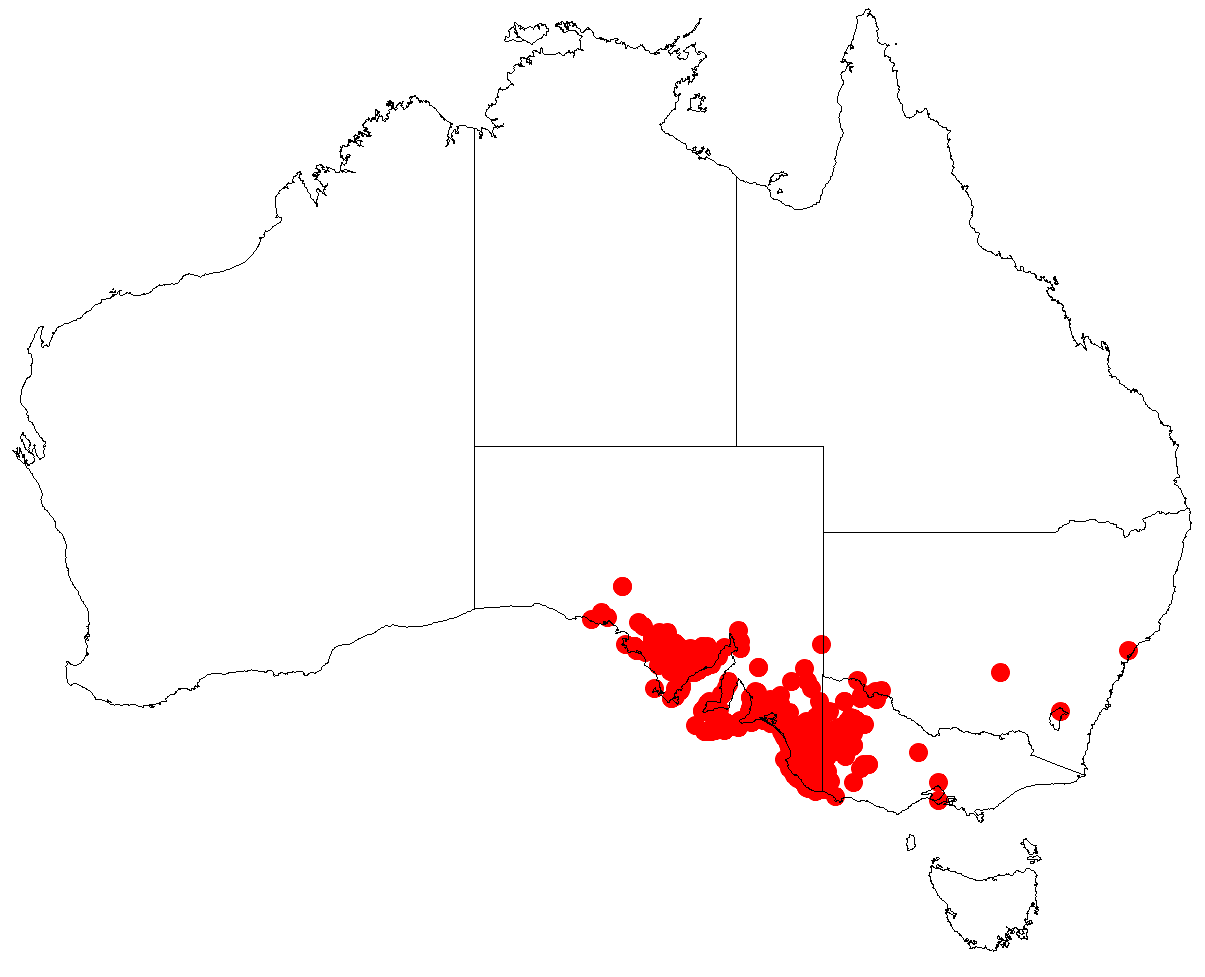
- Occurrence data from Australasian Virtual Herbarium

= Billardiera cymosa =

Sweet apple-berry

Species of plant

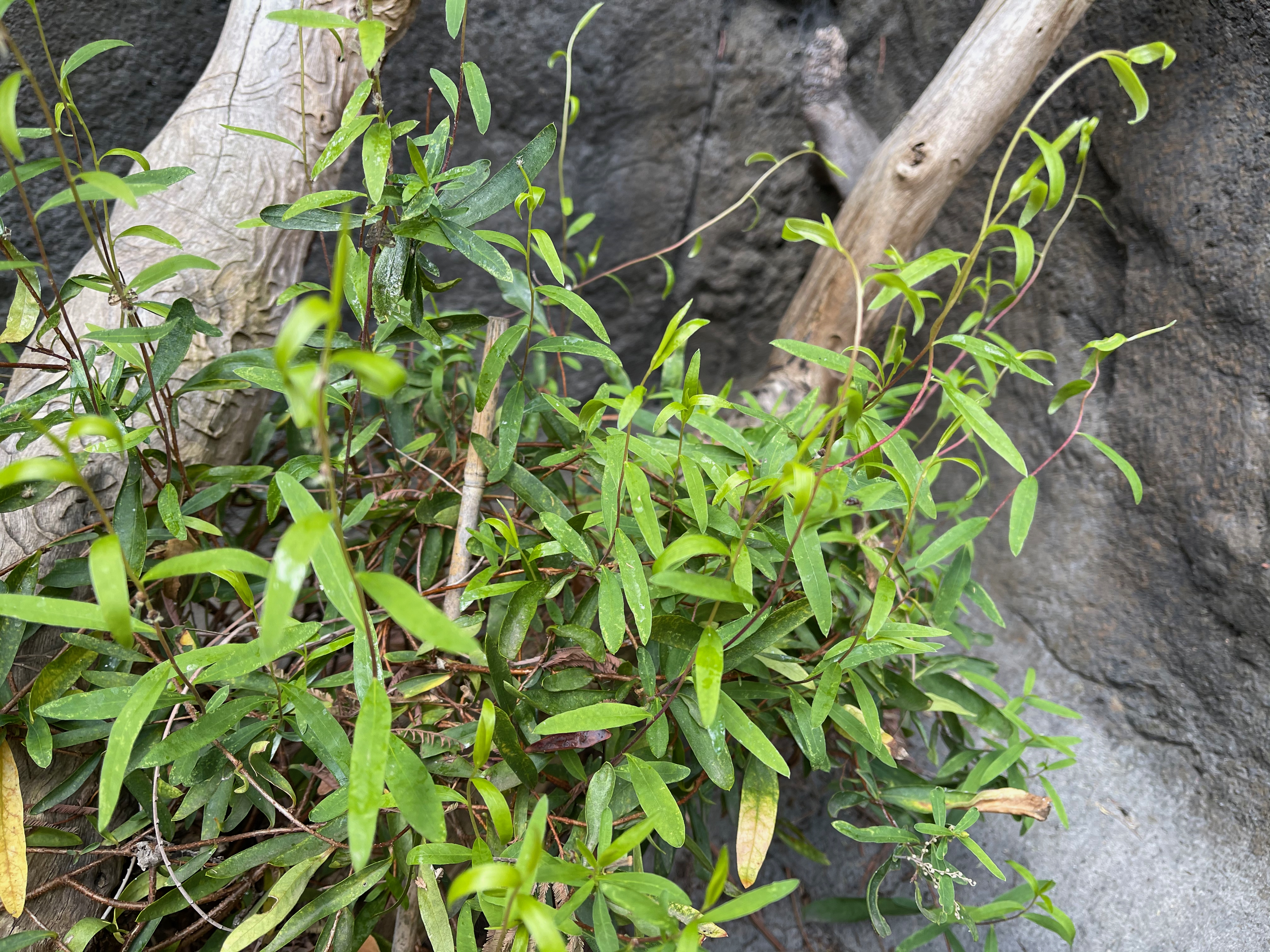
Habit

Billardiera cymosa, commonly known as sweet apple-berry or love fruit, is a species of flowering plant in the family Pittosporaceae and is endemic to south-eastern continental Australia. It is usually a slender climber that has narrowly egg-shaped leaves and pale blue or pale purplish flowers arranged in groups of about five to twelve.

== Description ==
Billardiera cymosa is usually a slender climber or twiner that has its new shoots softly-hairy, later glabrous and reddish-brown. The adult leaves are arranged alternately, narrowly egg-shaped to narrowly elliptic or almost linear, 30–65 mm (1.2–2.6 in) long and 6–13 mm (0.24–0.51 in) wide on a short petiole. The flowers are arranged in corymbs of about five to twelve with softly-hairy bracts and bracteoles but that fall off as the flowers open. The sepals are yellowish-green or brown, lance-shaped, 2–6 mm (0.079–0.236 in) long and the petals pale blue or pale purplish and 11–20 mm (0.43–0.79 in) long, forming a tube with spreading lobes. Flowering occurs from October to January and the mature fruit is a dark purple berry 12–15 mm (0.47–0.59 in) long containing many seeds.

== Taxonomy ==
Billardiera cymosa was first formally described in 1855 by Ferdinand von Mueller in Flora Australiensis in Transactions and Proceedings of the Victorian Institute for the Advancement of Science. The specific epithet (cymosa) means "cymose".

In 2004, Lindy Cayzer, Michael Douglas Crisp and Ian Telford described two subspecies of B. cymosa in Australian Systematic Botany, and the names are accepted by the Australian Plant Census:

- Billardiera cymosa F.Muell. subsp. cymosa has leaves 36–60 mm (1.4–2.4 in) long and 6–13 mm (0.24–0.51 in) wide, the sepals 2–3 mm (0.079–0.118 in) long, and the ovary silky hairy.
- Billardiera cymosa subsp. pseudocymosa (F.Muell. ex Klatt) L.W.Cayzer & Crisp, (previously known as Billardiera pseudocymosa F.Muell. ex Klatt has leaves 30–50 mm (1.2–2.0 in) long and 3–6 mm (0.12–0.24 in) wide, the sepals 3–4 mm (0.12–0.16 in) long, and the ovary glabrous.

== Distribution and habitat ==
Sweet apple-berry grows in mallee and eucalypt woodland in the south-east of South Australia and western Victoria. Subspecies cymosa is found on the Yorke Peninsula and in the Southern Lofty and Murray Basin areas, extending into the Wimmera region of western Victoria. Subspecies pseudocymosa mainly occurs on the Eyre Peninsula but also in parts of the Eyre Peninsula with subsp. cymosa, and on the northern plains of Victoria from Wyperfeld to Mildura.
