= Billardiera viridiflora =

Scientific classification
- Kingdom: Plantae
- Clade: Tracheophytes
- Clade: Angiosperms
- Clade: Eudicots
- Clade: Asterids
- Order: Apiales
- Family: Pittosporaceae
- Genus: Billardiera
- Species: B. viridiflora

Binomial name
- Billardiera viridiflora L.W.Cayzer & D.L.Jones
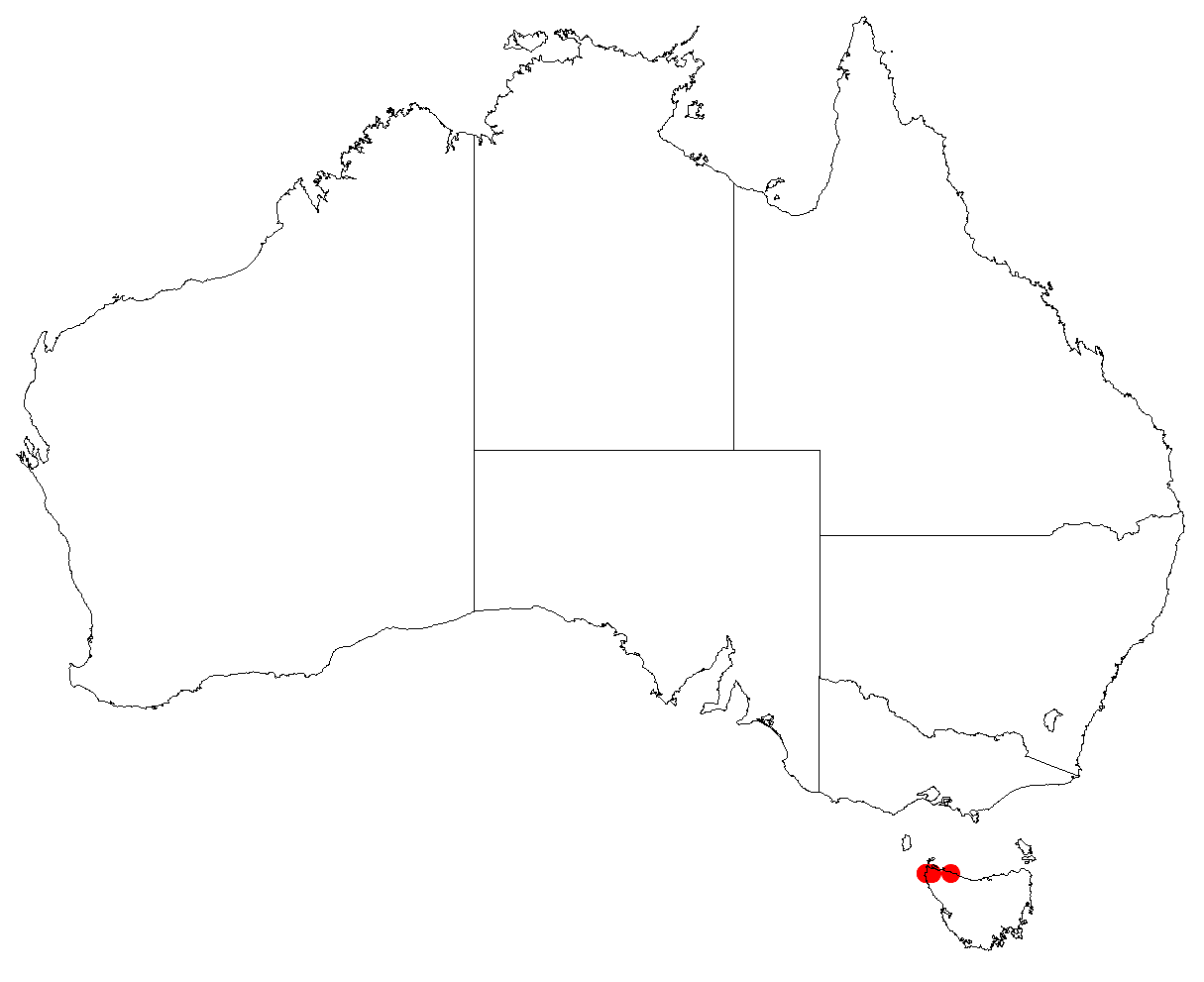
- Occurrence data from Australasian Virtual Herbarium

Species of flowering plant

Billardiera viridiflora is a species of flowering plant in the family Pittosporaceae and is endemic to a small area in the north-west of Tasmania. It is a twining shrub that has narrowly elliptic leaves and pendent greenish yellow flowers that turn a deeper yellow as they age.

== Description ==
Billardiera viridiflora is a twining shrub or climber, its oldest stems reddish brown. The adult leaves are narrowly elliptic, about 40 mm (1.6 in) long and 5–8 mm (0.20–0.31 in) wide on a petiole up to 4 mm (0.16 in) long. The flowers are arranged singly on slender, down-turned peduncles up to 35 mm (1.4 in) long. The sepals are narrowly egg-shaped, greenish-mauve, and the petals are greenish yellow, turning deeper yellow as they age, up to 40 mm (1.6 in) long, the petal lobes spatula-shaped. This species is similar to B. longiflora but has bright blue pollen. Flowering occurs from November to January and the mature fruit is an oblong, purple berry 10–12 mm (0.39–0.47 in) long, containing reddish brown seeds.

== Taxonomy ==
Billardiera viridiflora was first formally described in 2004 by Lindy W. Cayzer and David L. Jones in Australian Systematic Botany from specimens collected near Marrawah in 1998. The specific epithet (viridiflora) means "green-flowered".

== Distribution and habitat ==
This species of billardiera grows in moist forest near Marrawah in north-west Tasmania.`
