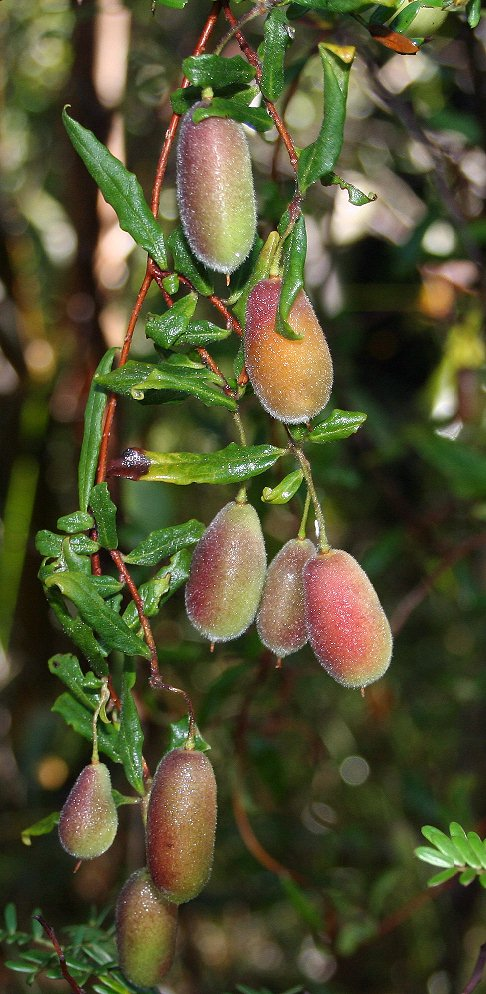
- Billardiera scandens, fruit - Lawson, NSW

Scientific classification
- Kingdom: Plantae
- Clade: Tracheophytes
- Clade: Angiosperms
- Clade: Eudicots
- Clade: Asterids
- Order: Apiales
- Family: Pittosporaceae
- Genus: Billardiera; Sm.

Species
- See text

Synonyms
- List: Billarderia Spreng. orth. var.; Billardiera sect. Billardieriopsis Pax; Billardiera sect. Eubillardiera Pax nom. inval.; Billardiera ser. Uniloculares E.M.Benn.; Billardierea T.Post & Kuntze orth. var.; Labillardiera Schult. nom. illeg., nom. superfl.; Pronaya Hügel ex Endl.; Sollya Lindl.

= Billardiera =

Genus of plants

Billardiera, commonly known as appleberries, snot berries, or bluebell creepers, is a genus of flowering plants in the family, Pittosporaceae and is endemic to Australia. Plants in the genus Billardiera are woody scramblers, climbers or twiners with elliptic, lance-shaped or linear leaves arranged alternately along the stems, the flowers with petals that are joined to form a tube at the base with spreading lobes, and succulent or fleshy fruit.

== Description ==
Plants in the genus Billardiera are woody scramblers, climbers or undershrubs with twining branches up to several metres long. The leaves are simple, elliptic, lance-shaped or linear and arranged alternately along the stems. The flowers are arranged singly or in cymes on the ends of branches and are greenish-yellow to cream-coloured, purple or blue, the sepals free from each other. The five petals are much longer than the sepals, sometimes free from each other, or joined at the base to form a tube with spreading lobes. The stamens are free from each other, but sometimes have their anthers joined at the tip, encircling the style. The fruit is a succulent or fleshy, variously shaped berry containing many seeds.

== Taxonomy ==
The genus Billardiera was first formally described in 1793 by James Edward Smith in his book A Specimen of the Botany of New Holland, and the first species he described (the type species) was Billardiera scandens. The name, Billardiera honours Jacques-Julien Houtou de Labillardière.

=== Species list ===
The following is a list of species of Billardiera accepted by the Australian Plant Census as of May 2023:

- Billardiera coriacea Benth. (W.A.)
- Billardiera cymosa F.Muell. (S.A., Vic.)
- Billardiera drummondii (C.Morren) L.Cayzer & Crisp (W.A.)
- Billardiera floribunda (Putt.) F.Muell. – white-flowered billardiera (W.A.)
- Billardiera fraseri (Hook.) L.W.Cayzer, Crisp & I.Telford – elegant pronaya (W.A.)
- Billardiera fusiformis Labill. – Australian bluebell (Vic., W.A.)
- Billardiera heterophylla (Lindl.) L.W.Cayzer & Crisp – bluebell creeper, purple appleberry, Australian bluebell (W.A.)
- Billardiera laxiflora (Benth.) E.M.Benn. (W.A.)
- Billardiera lehmanniana F.Muell. (W.A.)
- Billardiera longiflora Labill. (Tas.)
- Billardiera macrantha Hook.f. (N.S.W., A.C.T., Vic., Tas.)
- Billardiera mutabilis Salisb. – climbing appleberry (N.S.W., A.C.T., Vic., Tas.)
- Billardiera nesophila L.W.Cayzer & D.L.Jones (Tas.)
- Billardiera ovalis Lindl. (Tas.)
- Billardiera rubens L.W.Cayzer, Crisp & I.Telford (Qld., N.S.W.)
- Billardiera scandens Sm. - hairy appleberry (S.A., Qld., N.S.W., A.C.T., Vic.)
- Billardiera sericophora F.Muell. (S.A.)
- Billardiera speciosa (Endl.) F.Muell. (W.A.)
- Billardiera uniflora E.M.Benn. (S.A.)
- Billardiera variifolia DC. (W.A.)
- Billardiera venusta (Putt.) L.W.Cayzer & Crisp (W.A.)
- Billardiera versicolor F.Muell. ex Klatt – pale appleberry (S.A., N.S.W., Vic.)
- Billardiera viridiflora L.W.Cayzer & D.L.Jones (Tas.)
