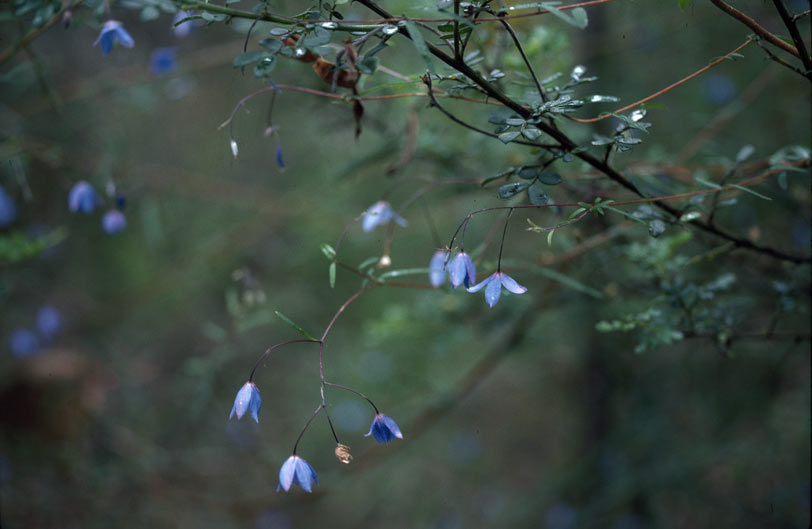
- In the Stirling Range National Park

Scientific classification
- Kingdom: Plantae
- Clade: Tracheophytes
- Clade: Angiosperms
- Clade: Eudicots
- Clade: Asterids
- Order: Apiales
- Family: Pittosporaceae
- Genus: Billardiera
- Species: B. drummondii

Binomial name
- Billardiera drummondii (C.Morren) L.W.Cayzer & Crisp
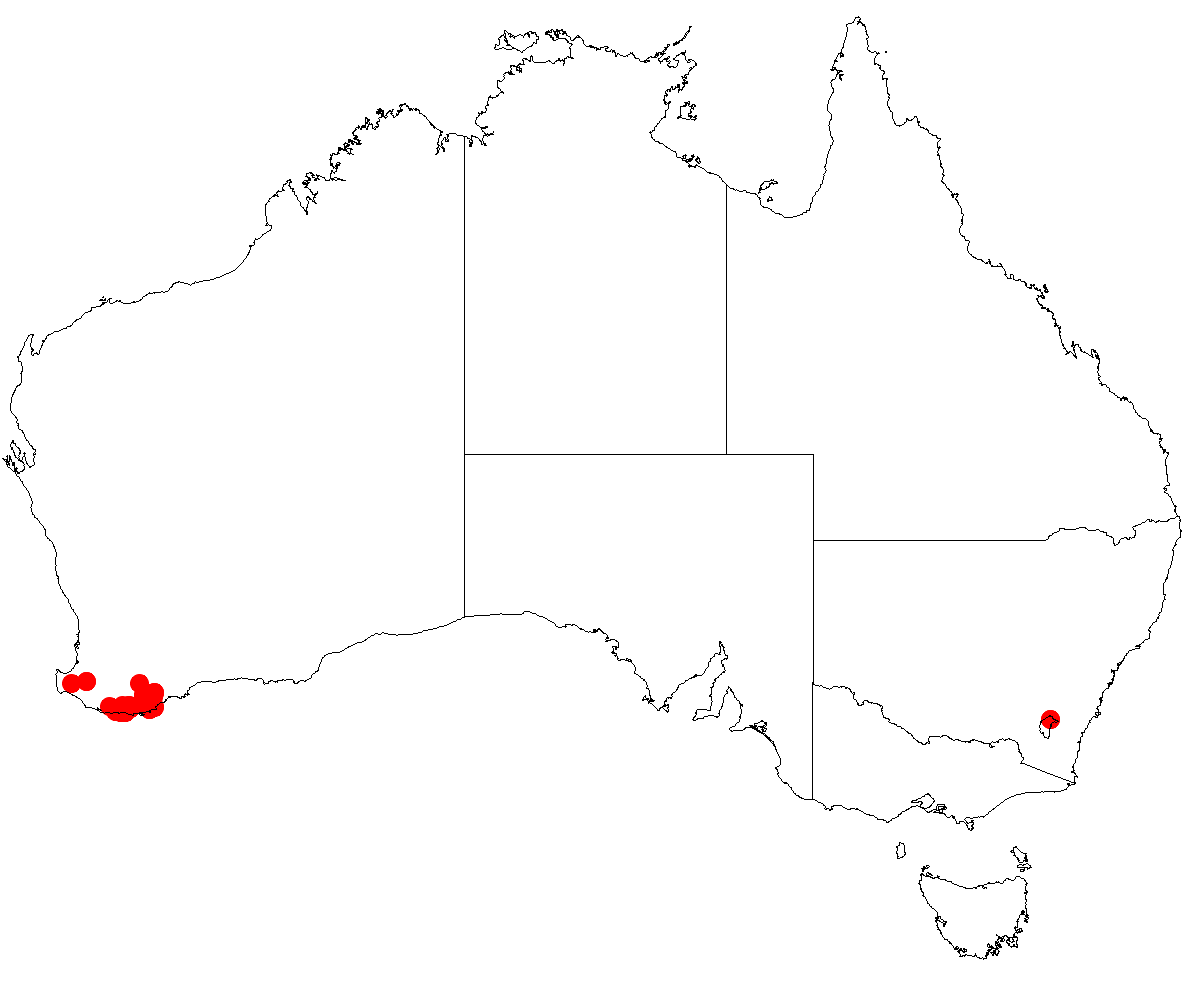
- Occurrence data from Australasian Virtual Herbarium

Synonyms
- Sollya drummondii C.Morren; Sollya parviflora Turcz.; Xerosollya gilbertii Turcz.

= Billardiera drummondii =

Species of flowering plant

Billardiera drummondii is a species of flowering plant in the family Pittosporaceae and is endemic to the south-west of Western Australia. It is a slender climber that has linear leaves and tiny nodding, blue or mauve flowers arranged in groups of up to three.

== Description ==
Billardiera drummondii is a slender climber or twiner that has silky-hairy new shoots, the first leaves with petioles as long as the leaf blade. The adult leaves are linear, 10–20 mm (0.39–0.79 in) long and 2–3 mm (0.079–0.118 in) wide on a petiole 1–2 mm (0.039–0.079 in) long. The edges of the leaves are wavy, and both surfaces are silky-hairy at first, later glabrous. The tiny, nodding flowers are arranged in corymbs of up to three on a rachis up to 10 mm (0.39 in) long, each flower on a pedicel 6–7 mm (0.24–0.28 in) long. The sepals are narrowly triangular, densely hairy and 2–3 mm (0.079–0.118 in) long, the petals blue or mauve, 6–8 mm (0.24–0.31 in) long and about 2 mm (0.079 in) wide. Flowering mainly occurs in January and the mature fruit is a dark green or purple berry less than 10 mm (0.39 in) long, containing reddish-brown seeds.

== Taxonomy ==
This climber was first formally described in 1854 by Charles Morren who gave it the name Sollya drummondii in La Belgique Horticole. In 2004, Lindy Cayzer and Michael Crisp transferred the species to Ballardiera as B. drummondii in Australian Systematic Botany. The specific epithet (drummondii) honours James Drummond.

== Distribution and habitat ==
Billardiera drummondii grows in eucalypt woodland in the Esperance Plains, Jarrah Forest and Warren bioregions of south-western Western Australia.

== Conservation status ==
Billardiera drummondii is listed as "not threatened" by the Western Australian Government Department of Biodiversity, Conservation and Attractions.
