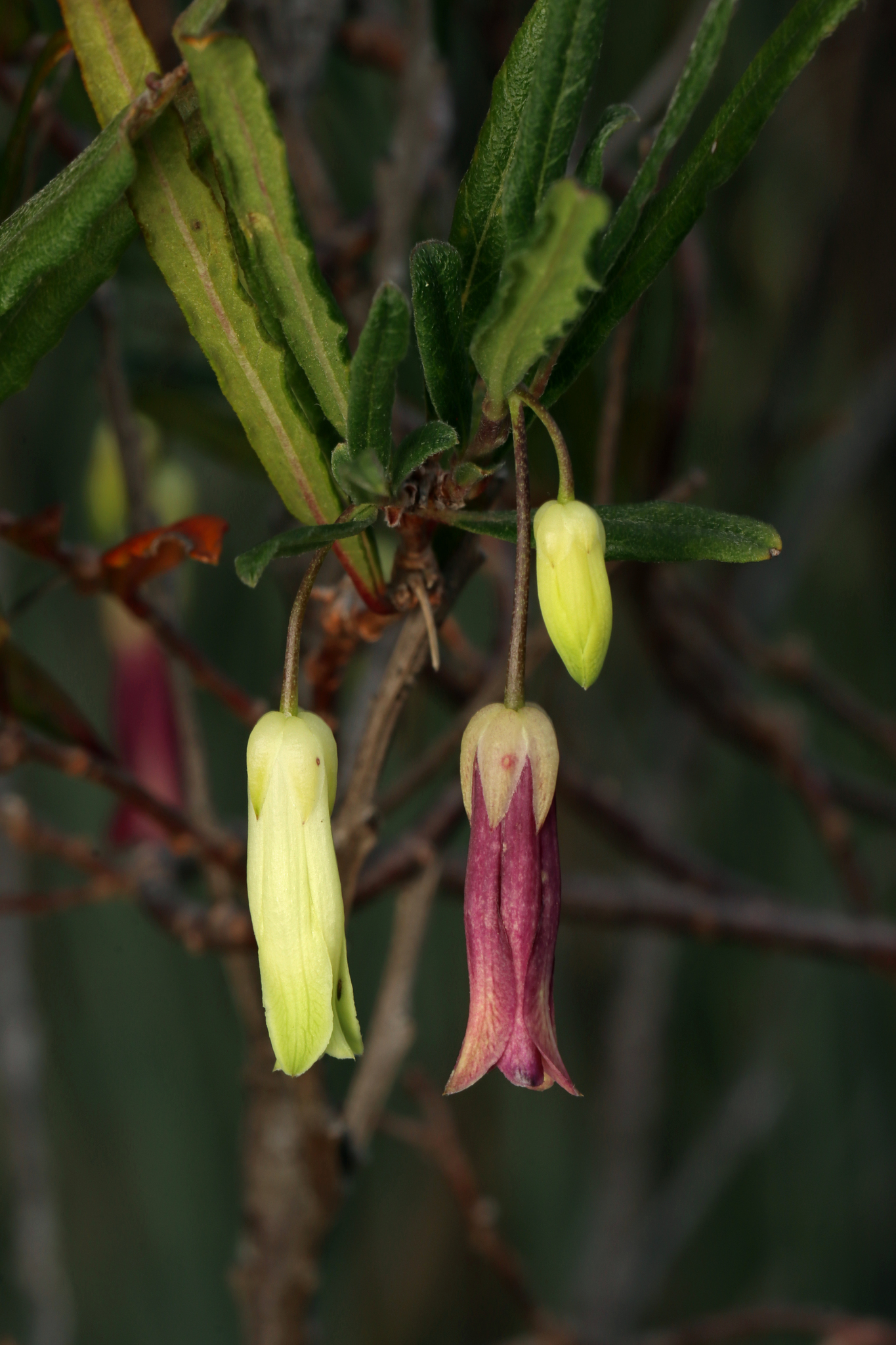

Conservation status
- Near Threatened (IUCN 3.1)

Scientific classification
- Kingdom: Plantae
- Clade: Tracheophytes
- Clade: Angiosperms
- Clade: Eudicots
- Clade: Asterids
- Order: Apiales
- Family: Pittosporaceae
- Genus: Billardiera
- Species: B. uniflora

Binomial name
- Billardiera uniflora E.M.Benn.
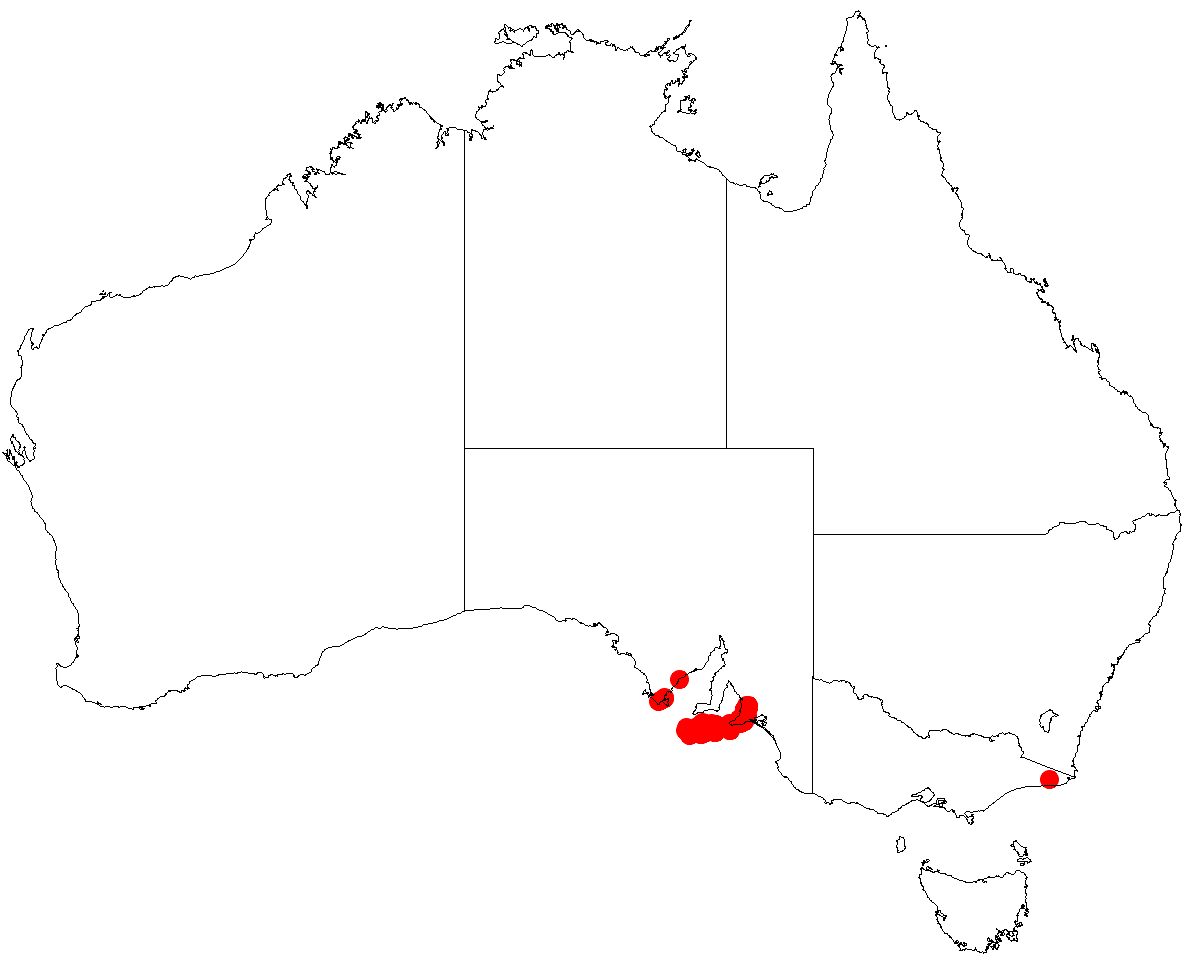
- Occurrence data from Australasian Virtual Herbarium

= Billardiera uniflora =

Species of shrub endemic to South Australia

Billardiera uniflora is a species of flowering plant in the family Pittosporaceae and is endemic to part of the south-east of South Australia. It is a glabrous, woody climber with narrowly elliptic leaves and pendent yellow flowers arranged singly or in pairs.

== Description ==
Billardiera uniflora is glabrous, woody climber with narrowly elliptic leaves, 40–52 mm (1.6–2.0 in) long and 4–6 mm (0.16–0.24 in) wide with wavy edges. The flowers are arranged singly or in pairs on a thin, down-curved, more or less glabrous peduncle 10–14 mm (0.39–0.55 in) long. The sepals are egg-shaped, 4–5 mm (0.16–0.20 in) long and about 1.5 mm (0.059 in) wide. The petals are yellow and turn pinkish-red as they age, 17–19 mm (0.67–0.75 in) long and 2.0–2.8 mm (0.079–0.110 in) wide. Flowering occurs in August and September and the mature fruit is a glabrous oblong berry 30–40 mm (1.2–1.6 in) long containing brown seeds 2–3 mm (0.079–0.118 in) long.

== Taxonomy ==
Billardiera uniflora was formally described in 1978 by Eleanor Marion Bennett in the journal Nuytsia from specimens collected near Port Lincoln. The specific epithet (uniflora) refers to the usually single-flowered inflorescence.

== Distribution and habitat ==
This species grows in mallee scrub and coastal heath on limestone and is endemic to the Mount Lofty and Port Lincoln areas and Kangaroo Island in south-eastern South Australia.
