= Billardiera laxiflora =

Scientific classification
- Kingdom: Plantae
- Clade: Tracheophytes
- Clade: Angiosperms
- Clade: Eudicots
- Clade: Asterids
- Order: Apiales
- Family: Pittosporaceae
- Genus: Billardiera
- Species: B. laxiflora

Binomial name
- Billardiera laxiflora (Benth.) E.M.Benn.
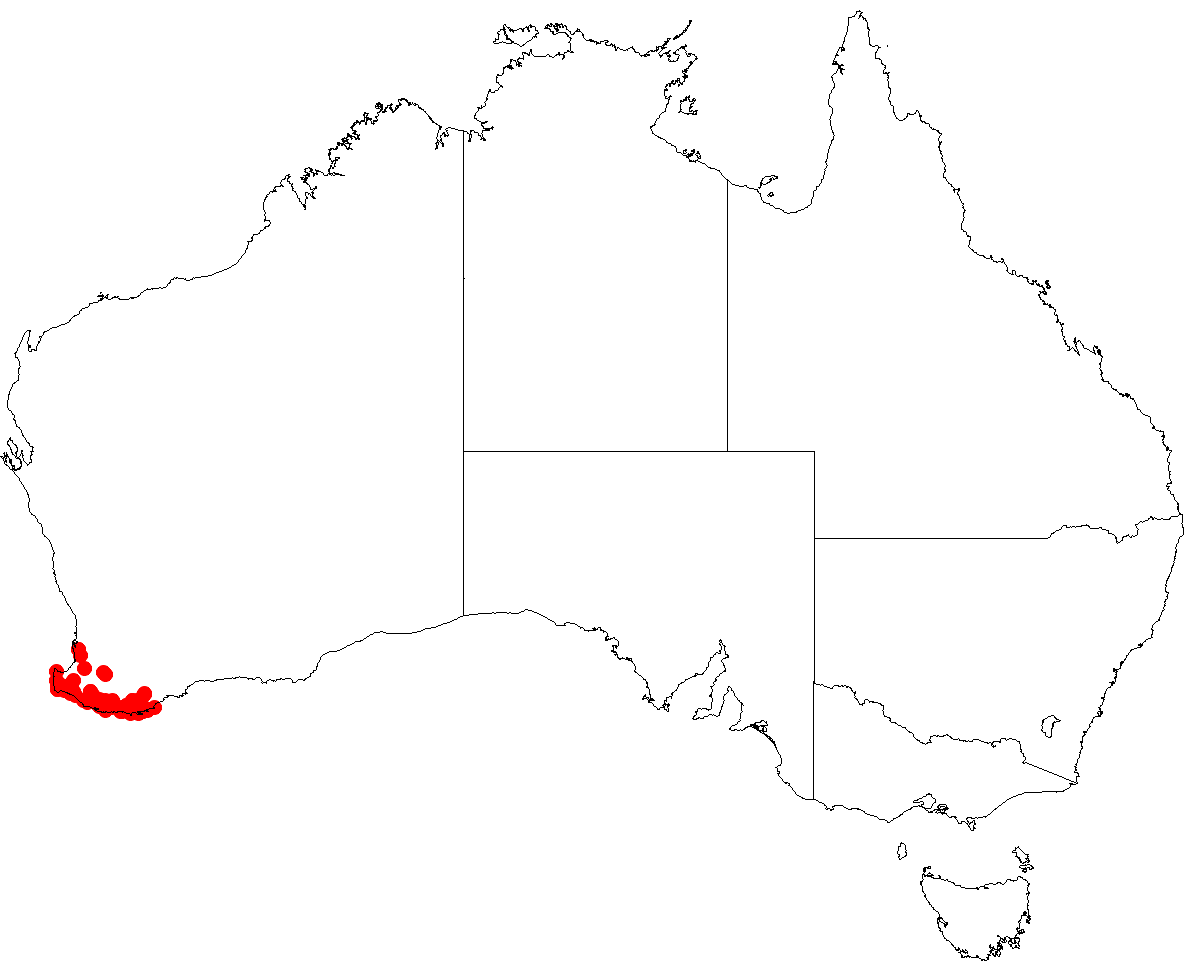
- Occurrence data from Australasian Virtual Herbarium

Synonyms
- Marianthus laxiflorus Benth.

Species of plant

Billardiera laxiflora is a species of flowering plant in the family Pittosporaceae and is endemic to the far south-west of Western Australia. It is a delicate, twining shrub or climber that has linear leaves and white flowers tinged or spotted with pink or mauve.

== Description ==
Billardiera laxiflora is a delicate, twining shrub or climber that typically grows to a height of 50 cm (20 in) and has reddish-brown stems. The adult leaves are more or less linear, 8–20 mm (0.31–0.79 in) long and 1–2 mm (0.039–0.079 in) wide on a short petiole. The flowers are arranged in umbels on a thin peduncle 10–12 mm (0.39–0.47 in) long, each flower on a pedicel 6–10 mm (0.24–0.39 in) long. The sepals are mauve and green, 2.0–4.5 mm (0.079–0.177 in) long and of different lengths. The petals are white, spotted or tinged with pink or mauve, 4–8 mm (0.16–0.31 in) long. Flowering occurs from February to June and the mature fruit is a spindle-shaped berry about 42 mm (1.7 in) long.

== Taxonomy ==
This species was first formally described in 1863 by George Bentham who gave it the name Marianthus laxiflorus in Flora Australiensis. In 1972, Eleanor Marion Bennett transferred the species to Billardiera as B. laxiflora. The specific epithet (laxiflora) means "loose- or open-flowered".

== Distribution and habitat ==
Billardiera laxiflora grows in woodland and forest on laterite in the Esperance Plains, Jarrah Forest, Swan Coastal Plain and Warren bioregions of far south-western Western Australia.
