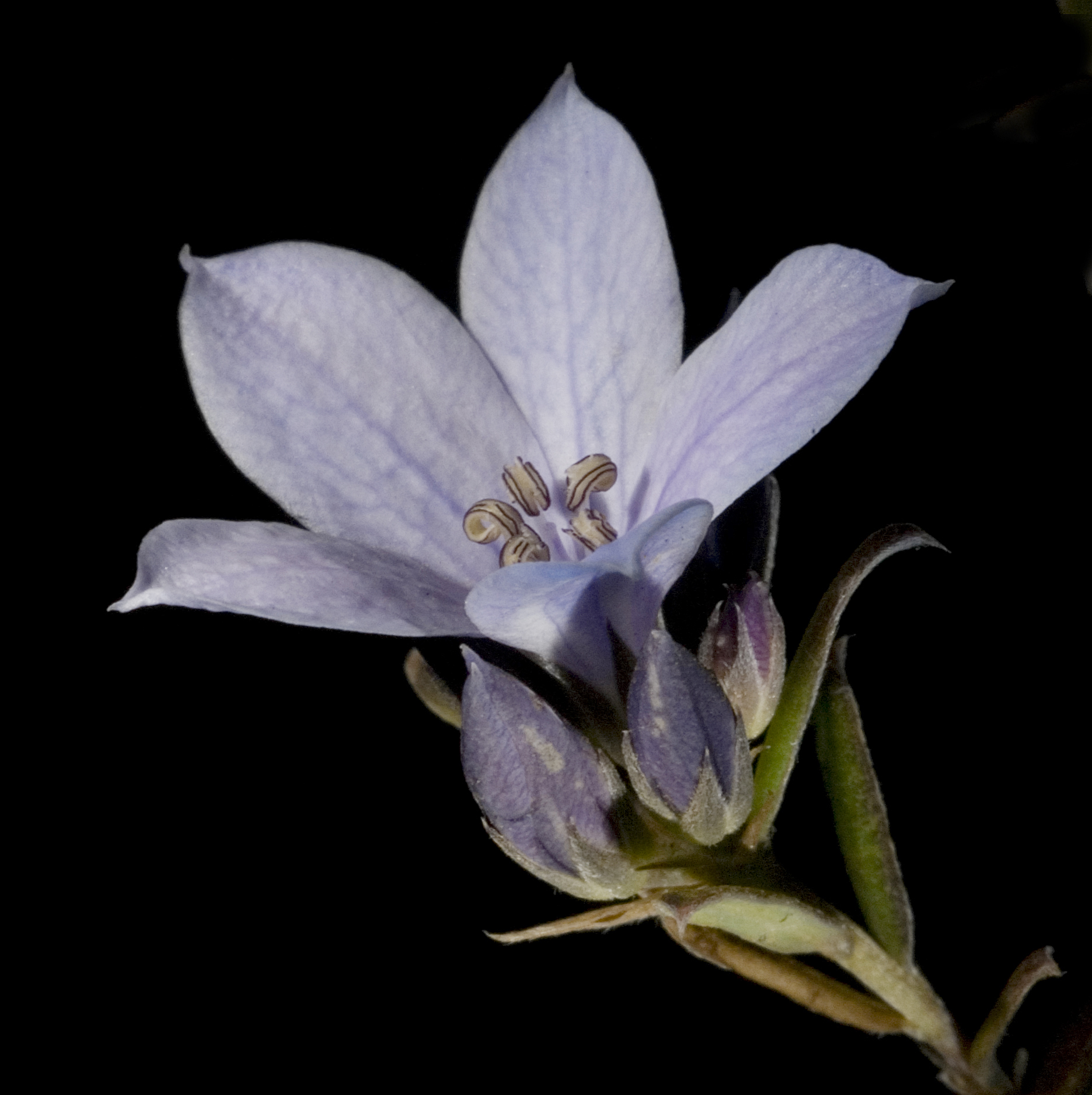

Scientific classification
- Kingdom: Plantae
- Clade: Tracheophytes
- Clade: Angiosperms
- Clade: Eudicots
- Clade: Asterids
- Order: Apiales
- Family: Pittosporaceae
- Genus: Billardiera
- Species: B. speciosa

Binomial name
- Billardiera speciosa (Endl.) F.Muell.
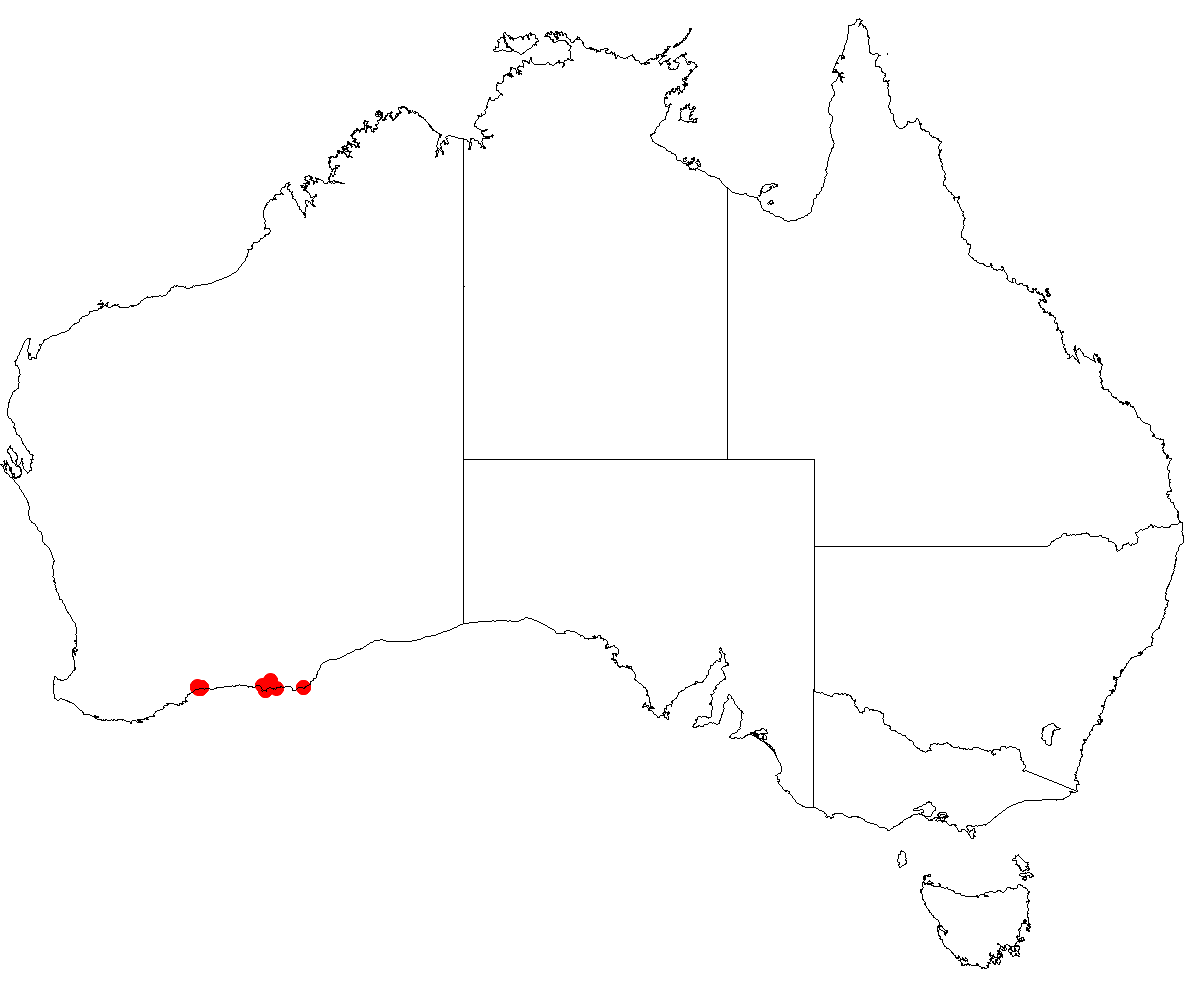
- Occurrence data from Australasian Virtual Herbarium

Synonyms
- Pronaya elegans var. minor Benth.; Pronaya fraseri var. minor (Benth.) E.M.Benn.; Pronaya speciosa Hügel ex Endl.

= Billardiera speciosa =

Species of plant

Billardiera speciosa is a species of flowering plant in the family Pittosporaceae and is endemic to southern Western Australia. It is a slender climber that grows in coastal heath and has narrowly elliptic leaves with the edges rolled under and groups of purple or mauve flowers.

== Description ==
Billardiera speciosa is slender climber that has sessile, narrowly elliptic leaves 11–19 mm (0.43–0.75 in) long, about 2 mm (0.079 in) wide and often in clusters. The edges of the leaves are rolled under and there is a small point on th tip. The flowers are arranged in groups with bracts 8–9 mm (0.31–0.35 in) long at the base. The sepals are green, hairy and 3–4 mm (0.12–0.16 in) long and the petals are spatula-shaped, purple or mauve, 9–11 mm (0.35–0.43 in) long, and fade as they age. Flowering occurs in February.

== Taxonomy ==
This species was first formally described in 1837 by Stephan Endlicher who gave it the name Pronaya speciosa in Enumeratio plantarum quas in Novae Hollandiae ora austro-occidentali ad fluvium Cygnorum et in sinu Regis Georgii collegit Carolus Liber Baro de Hügel from an unpublished description by Charles von Hügel of a specimen collected by Ferdinand Bauer near King George Sound. In1862, Ferdinand von Mueller transferred the species to the genus Billardiera in The Plants Indigenous to the Colony of Victoria. The specific epithet (speciosa) means "showy".

== Distribution and habitat ==
Billardiera speciosa grows in coastal heath on limestone between East Mount Barren and Duke of Orleans Bay in the Esperance Plains bioregions of southern Western Australia.
