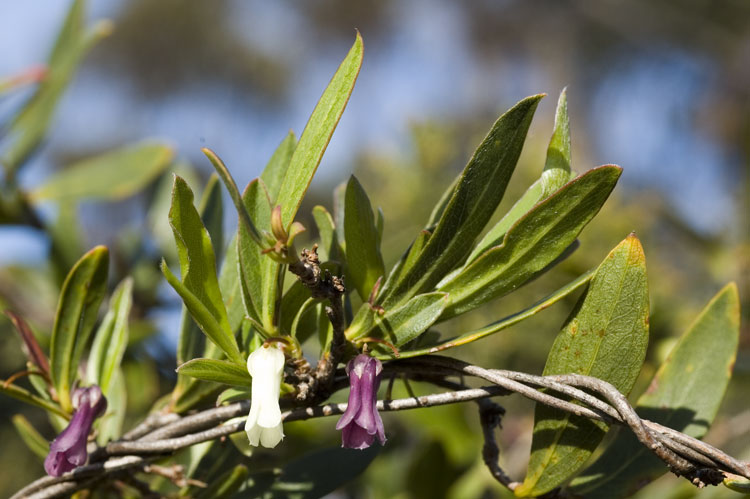
- Near Ravensthorpe

Scientific classification
- Kingdom: Plantae
- Clade: Tracheophytes
- Clade: Angiosperms
- Clade: Eudicots
- Clade: Asterids
- Order: Apiales
- Family: Pittosporaceae
- Genus: Billardiera
- Species: B. coriacea

Binomial name
- Billardiera coriacea Benth.
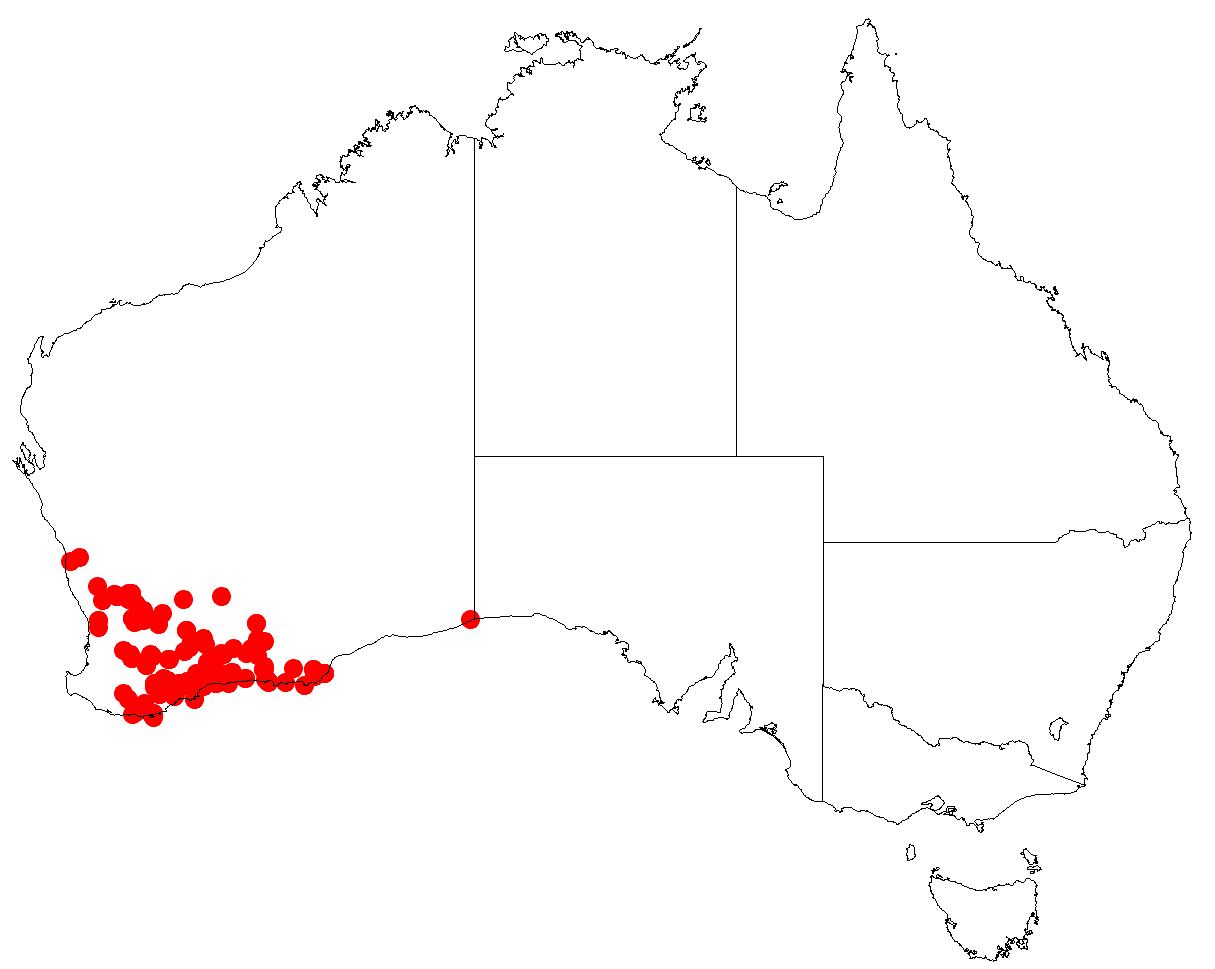
- Occurrence data from Australasian Virtual Herbarium

Synonyms
- Billardiera latifolia (Turcz.) Druce nom. illeg., nom. superfl.; Pronaya latifolia Turcz.

= Billardiera coriacea =

Species of plant

Billardiera coriacea is a species of flowering plant in the family Pittosporaceae and is endemic to the south-west of Western Australia. It is a woody scrambler or climber that has more or less oblong leaves, the flowers white to pale yellow and arranged singly or in small groups on short side shoots.

== Description ==
Billardiera coriacea is a woody scrambler or climber that has its new shoots covered with a few silky hairs, but later glabrous. Its young leaves are broadly elliptic, 40–50 mm (1.6–2.0 in) long and 15–25 mm (0.59–0.98 in) wide, the adult leaves more or less oblong,40–50 mm (1.6–2.0 in) long and 15–25 mm (0.59–0.98 in) wide on a short petiole. The flowers are arranged singly or in small groups on a peduncle 8–14 mm (0.31–0.55 in) long. The sepals are 4–5 mm (0.16–0.20 in) long and the petals white to pale yellow, later dark blue to purple, and 14–16 mm (0.55–0.63 in) long, the lobes spreading but not turned back. Flowering occurs from May to November and the mature fruit is a dark purple berry 20–25 mm (0.79–0.98 in) long with the seeds in papery liners.

== Taxonomy ==
Billardiera coriacea was first formally described in 1863 by George Bentham in Flora Australiensis. The specific epithet (coriacea) means "leathery".

== Distribution and habitat ==
This billardiera grows in dry woodland between Manmanning, Cunderdin, Peak Charles and Mount Arid in the Avon Wheatbelt, Coolgardie, Esperance Plains, Geraldton Sandplains, Jarrah Forest, Mallee and Warren of south-western Western Australia.Avon Wheatbelt, Coolgardie, Esperance Plains, Geraldton Sandplains, Jarrah Forest, Mallee, Warren.
