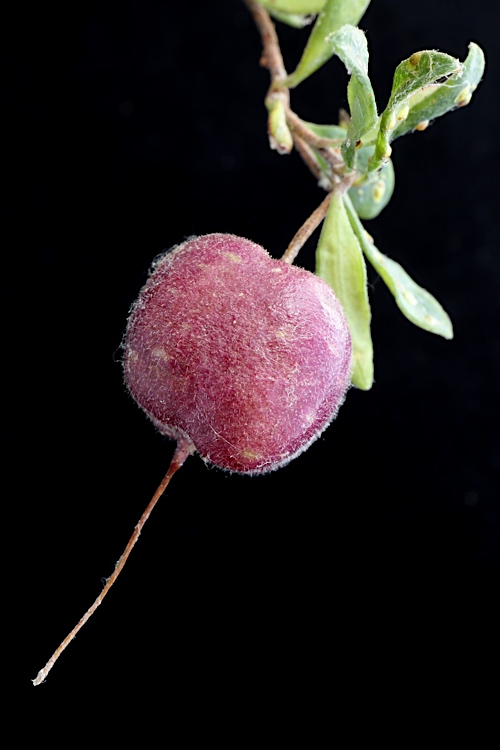
- In the Australian National Botanic Gardens

Scientific classification
- Kingdom: Plantae
- Clade: Tracheophytes
- Clade: Angiosperms
- Clade: Eudicots
- Clade: Asterids
- Order: Apiales
- Family: Pittosporaceae
- Genus: Billardiera
- Species: B. ovalis

Binomial name
- Billardiera ovalis Lindl.
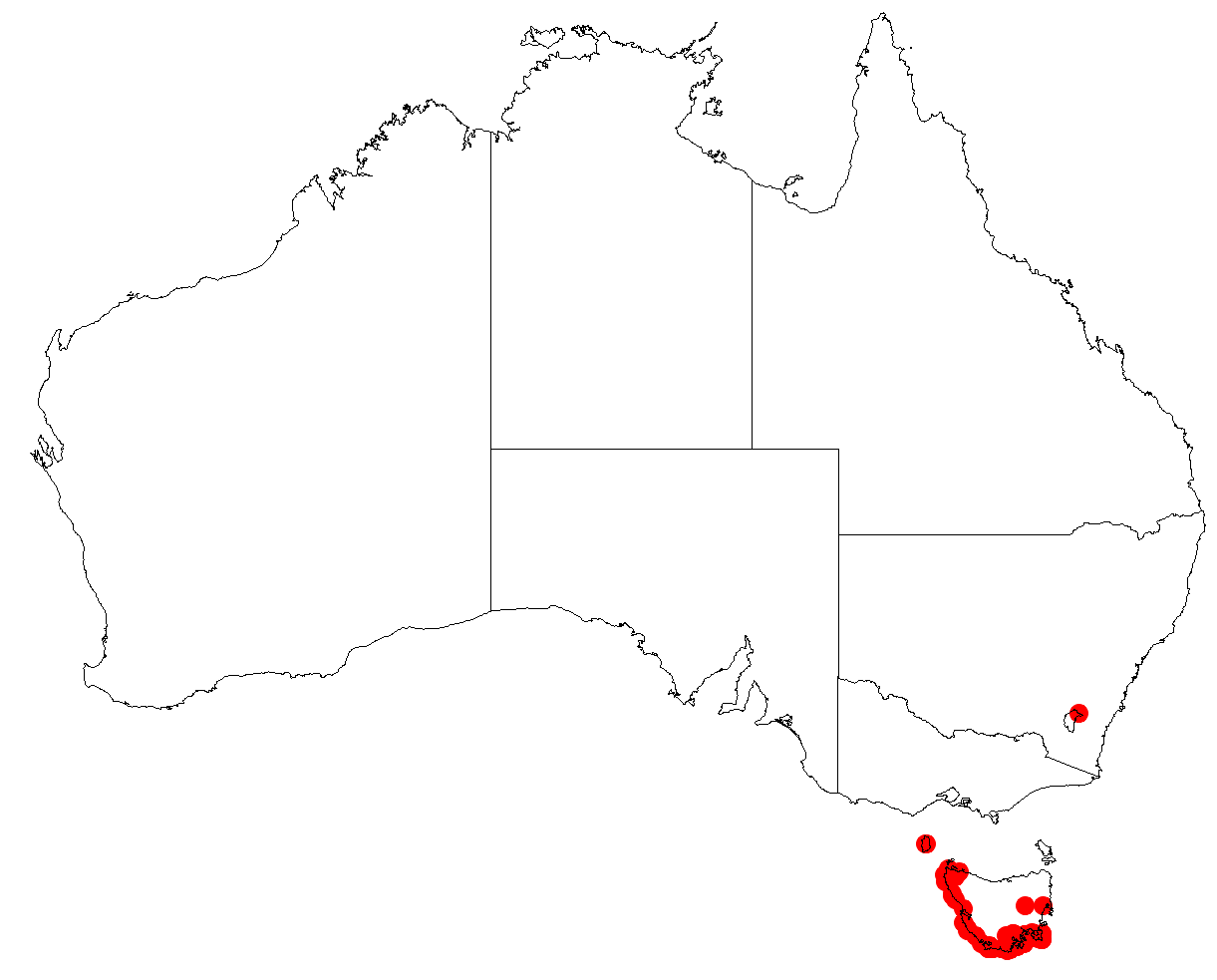
- Occurrence data from Australasian Virtual Herbarium

Synonyms
- Billardiera longiflora var. ovalis (Lindl.) E.M.Benn.

= Billardiera ovalis =

Species of flowering plant

Billardiera ovalis is a species of flowering plant in the family Pittosporaceae and is endemic to Tasmania. It is a woody, creeping scrambler with thick, egg-shaped or elliptic leaves, and creamy-yellow flowers arranged singly in leaf axils, but turning red as they age.

== Description ==
Billardiera ovalis is a woody, creeping scrambler with shaggy-hairy new shoots. Its leaves are clustered on short side-shoots and are spatula-shaped at first, later egg-shaped with the narrower end towards the base, or elliptic, 16–24 mm (0.63–0.94 in) long, about 5 mm (0.20 in) wide and more or less sessile. The leaves are thick, both surfaces pale green and waxy, streaked with purplish-red on the lower surface. The flowers are arranged singly on hairy peduncles 8–9 mm (0.31–0.35 in) long. The sepals are broadly egg-shaped, reddish-purple and overlap each other, 2.0–2.5 mm (0.079–0.098 in) long and about 1.5 mm (0.059 in) wide. The petals are creamy-yellow, turning wine red as they age, and less than 20 mm (0.79 in) long. Flowering occurs in summer and the mature fruit is usually a bright red, egg-shaped berry about 10 mm (0.39 in) long.

== Taxonomy ==
Billardiera ovalis was first formally described in 1834 by John Lindley in Edwards's Botanical Register. The specific epithet (ovalis) means "oval" or "elliptic".

== Distribution and habitat ==
This species of billardiera grows in scrub on coastal dolerite from King Island to south-eastern Tasmania.

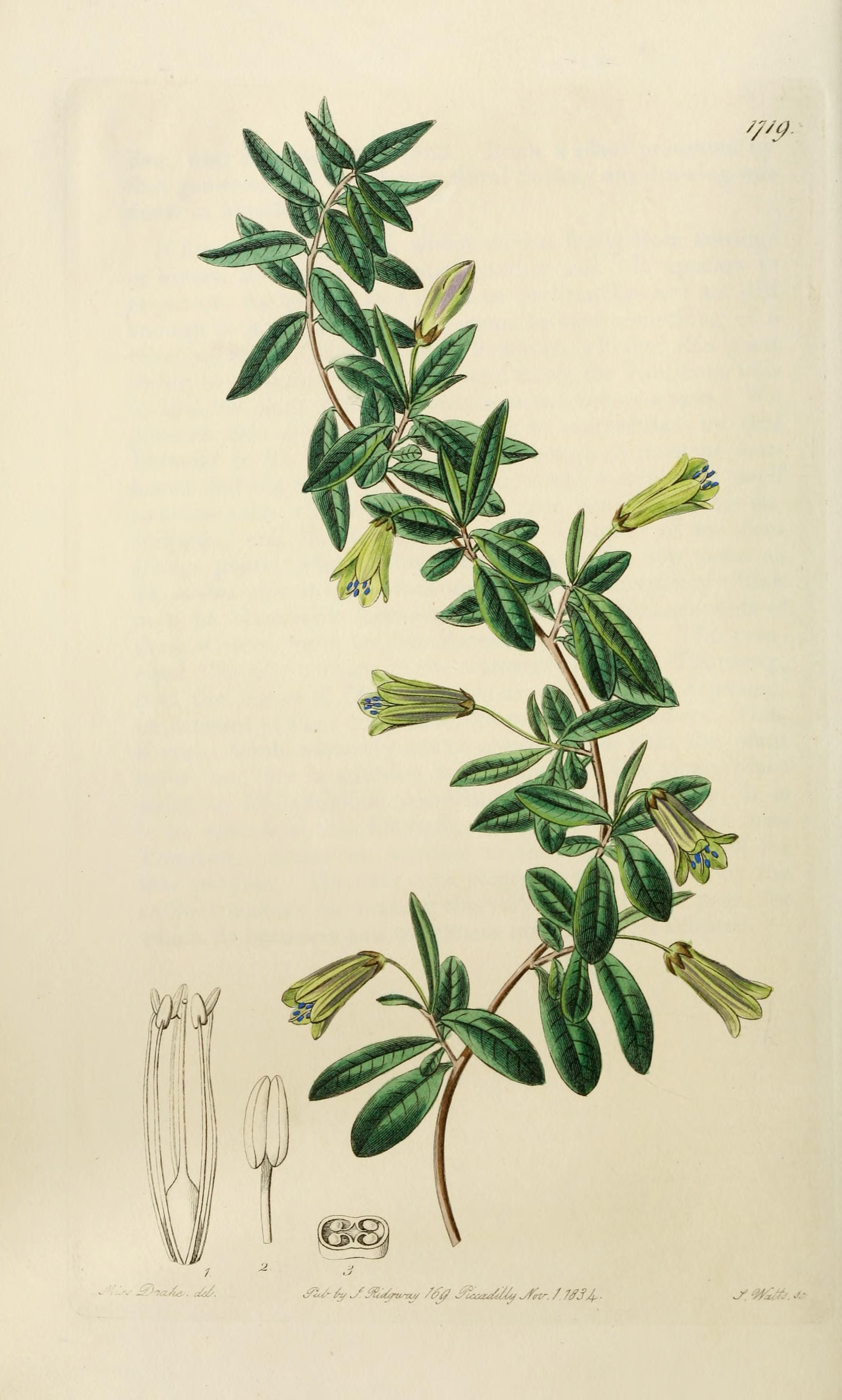
Illustration by Sarah Drake in Edwards's Botanical Register
