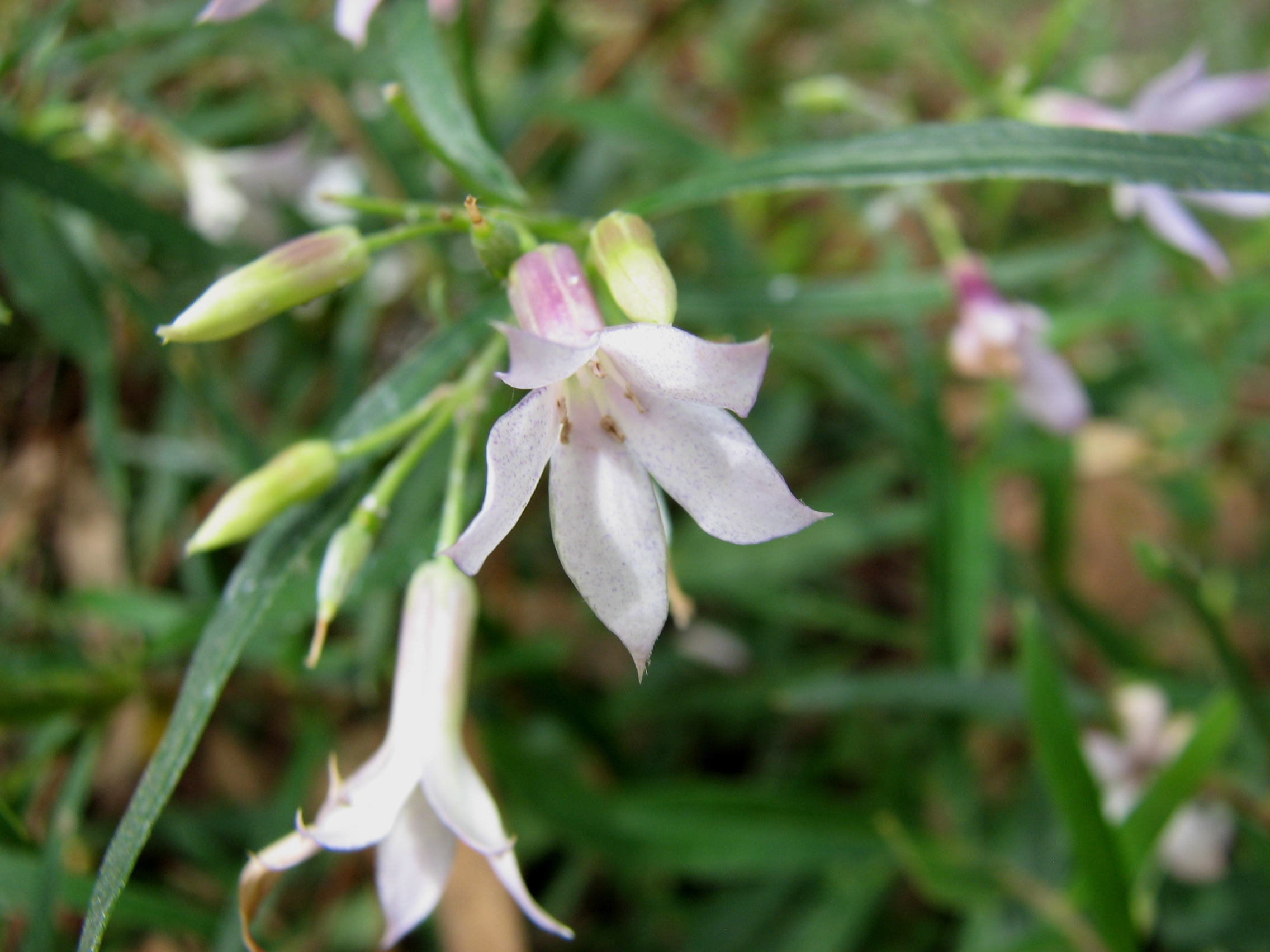

Scientific classification
- Kingdom: Plantae
- Clade: Tracheophytes
- Clade: Angiosperms
- Clade: Eudicots
- Clade: Asterids
- Order: Apiales
- Family: Pittosporaceae
- Genus: Billardiera
- Species: B. sericophora

Binomial name
- Billardiera sericophora F.Muell.
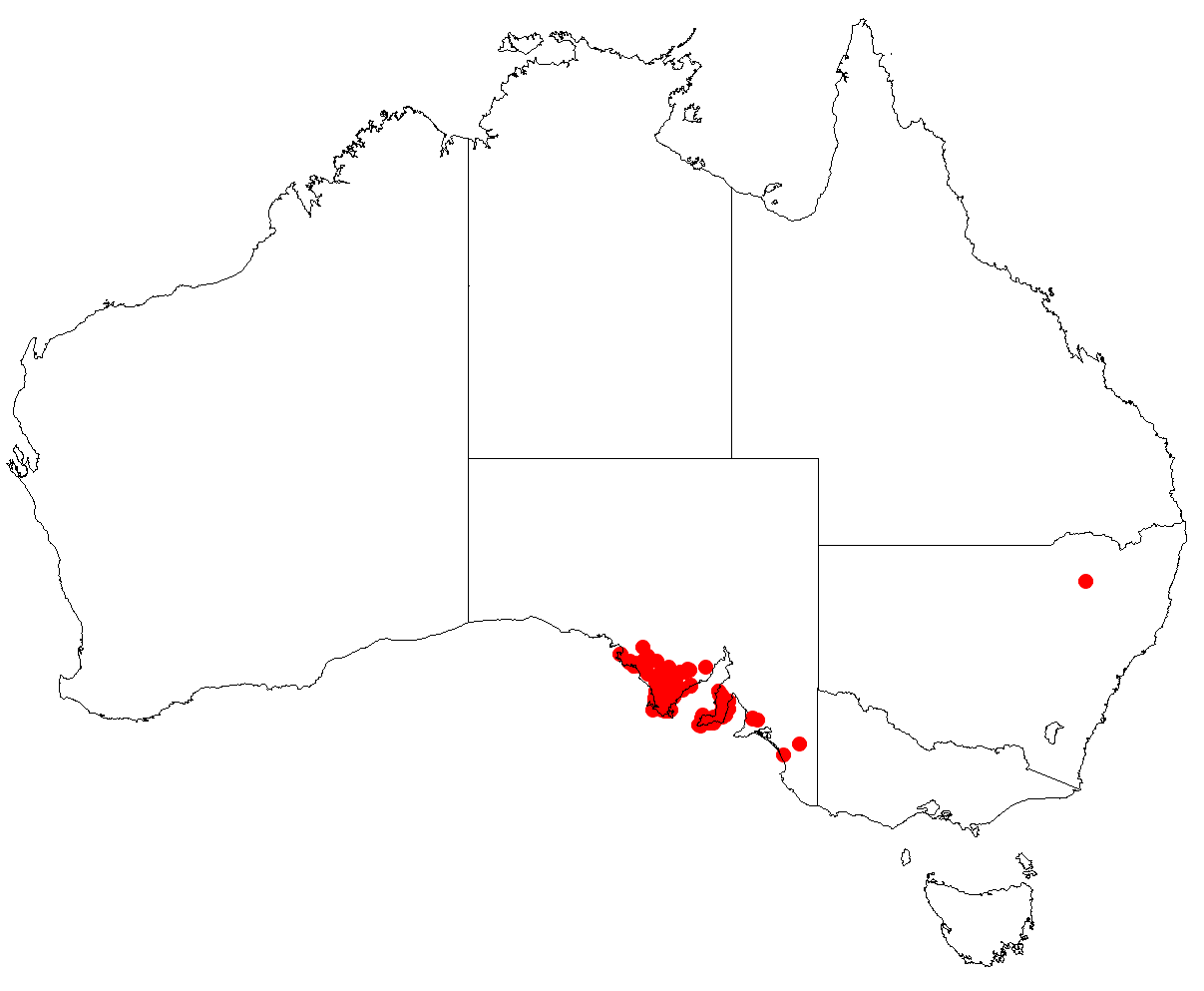
- Occurrence data from Australasian Virtual Herbarium

Synonyms
- List: Billardiera cymosa var. sericophora (F.Muell.) Benth.; Billardiera sericophora var. megaphylla F.Muell.; Billardiera sericophora F.Muell. var. sericophora

= Billardiera sericophora =

Species of shrub endemic to South Australia

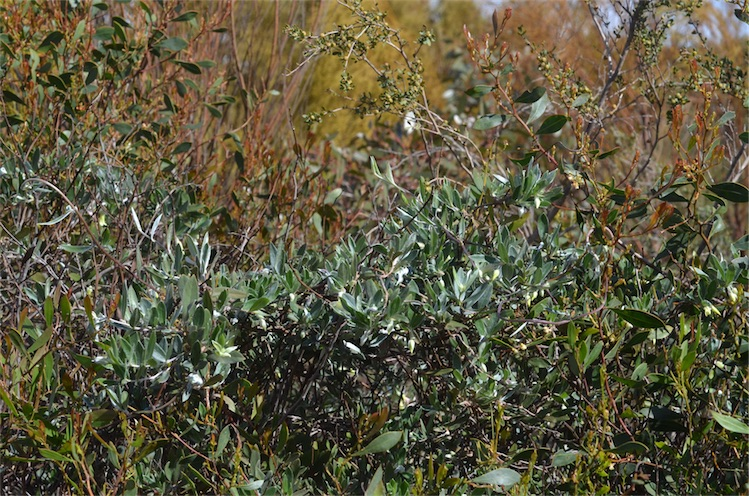
Habit

Billardiera sericophora is a species of flowering plant in the family Pittosporaceae and is endemic to the south-east of South Australia. It is spreading shrub or climber that has mostly narrowly elliptic leaves and pendent yellow flowers arranged singly or in pairs.

== Description ==
Billardiera sericophora is spreading, woody shrub, becoming a climber as it ages, densely covered with silky, silvery hairs. The adult leaves are mostly narrowly elliptic, 27–48 mm (1.1–1.9 in) long, 6–10 mm (0.24–0.39 in) wide and sessile. The edges of the leaves curve downwards, and both sides of the leaves are densely covered with silvery-grey hair, the upper surface becoming glabrous. The flowers are arranged singly or in groups of up to five on a down-curved, hairy peduncle 7–12 mm (0.28–0.47 in) long. The sepals are hairy and 5–10 mm (0.20–0.39 in) long and the petals yellow with purple veins and turn purple as they age, 15–18 mm (0.59–0.71 in) long. Flowering occurs from August to December and the mature fruit is a hairy, oblong berry 16–20 mm (0.63–0.79 in) long containing many seeds.

== Taxonomy ==
Billardiera sericophora was formally described in 1853 by botanist Ferdinand von Mueller in the journal Linnaea: Ein Journal für die Botanik in ihrem ganzen Umfange, oder Beiträge zur Pflanzenkunde following its discovery during a botanical survey of Port Lincoln by Carl Wilhelmi.

== Distribution and habitat ==
This species is endemic to the Eyre and Yorke Peninsulas in south-eastern South Australia where it grows in mallee scrub on coastal limestone and in the wheat belt.
