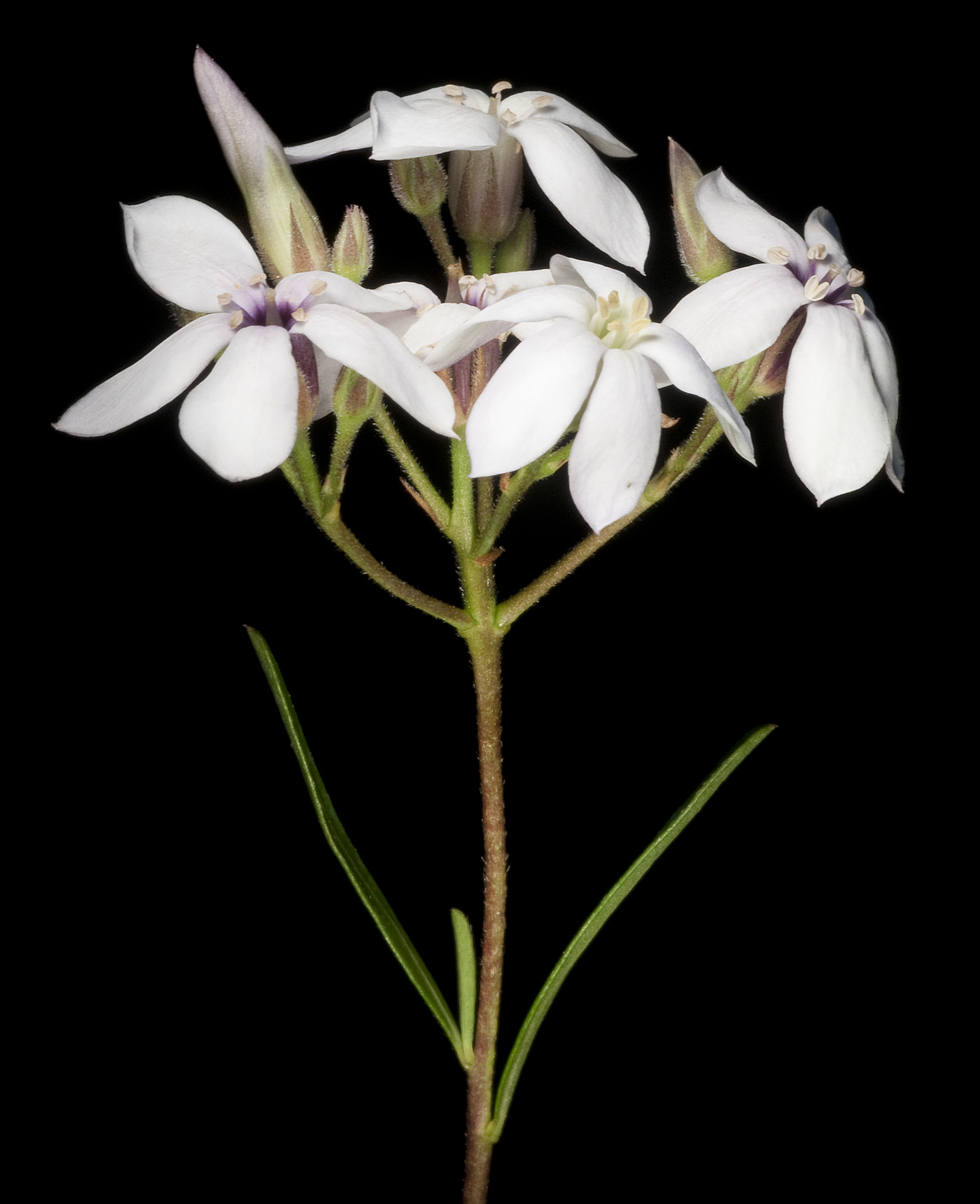
- In the Australian National Botanic Gardens

Scientific classification
- Kingdom: Plantae
- Clade: Tracheophytes
- Clade: Angiosperms
- Clade: Eudicots
- Clade: Asterids
- Order: Apiales
- Family: Pittosporaceae
- Genus: Billardiera
- Species: B. lehmanniana

Binomial name
- Billardiera lehmanniana F.Muell.
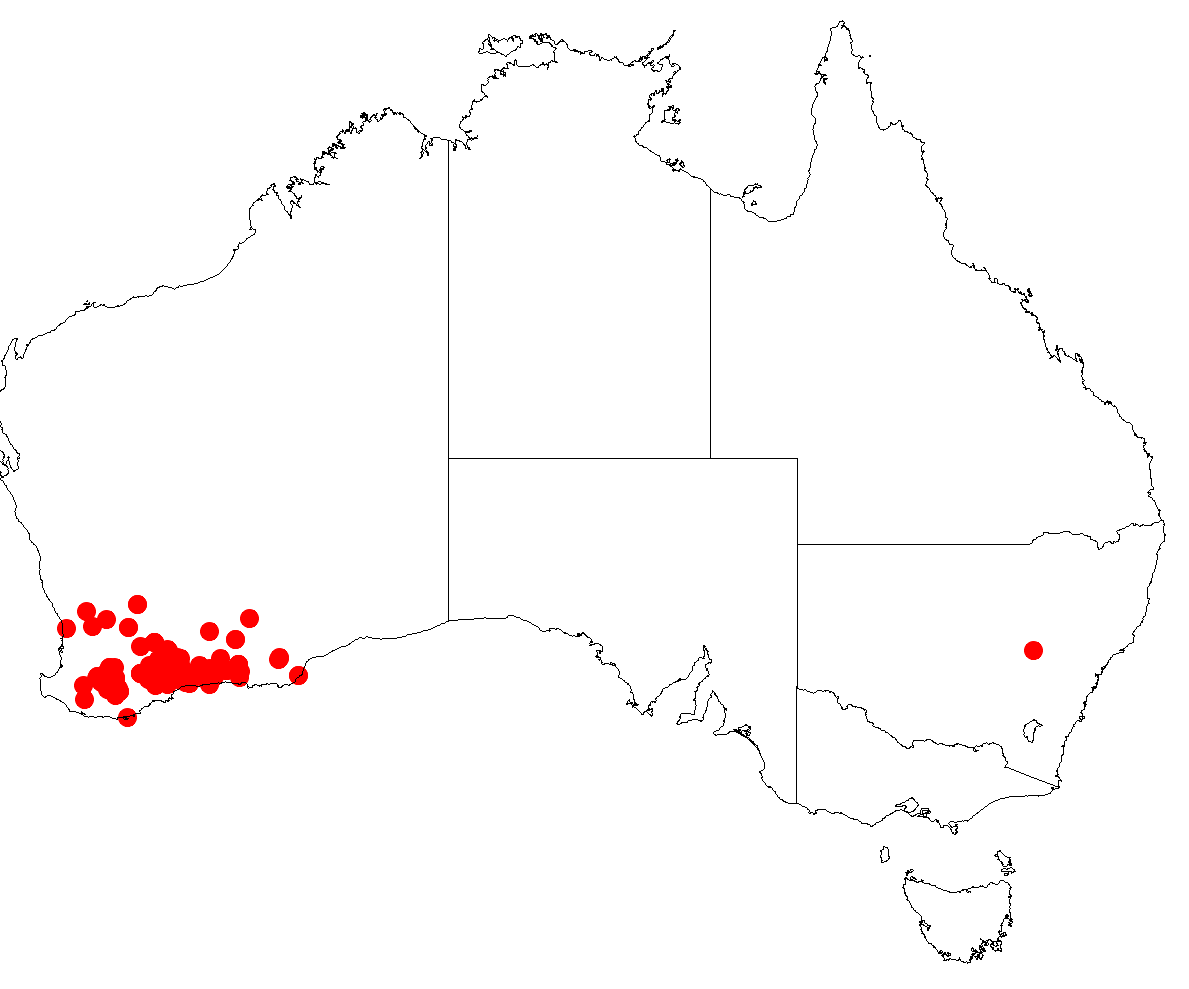
- Occurrence data from Australasian Virtual Herbarium

= Billardiera lehmanniana =

Sweet apple-berry

Species of plant

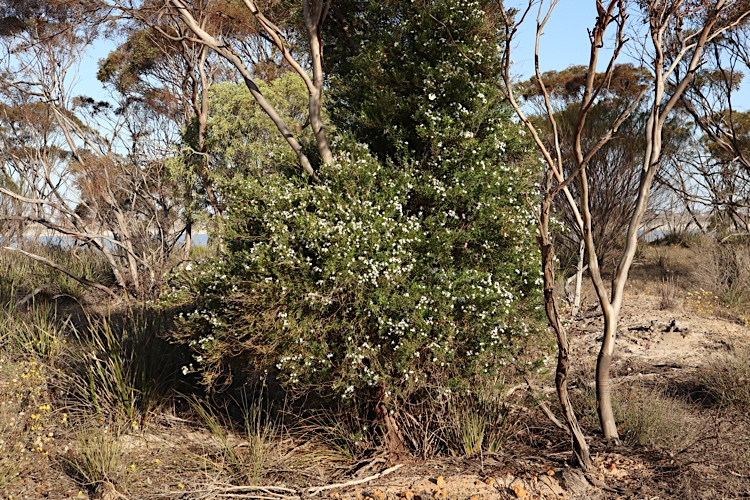
Habit near Ravensthorpe

Billardiera lehmanniana, commonly known as kurup, is a species of flowering plant in the family Pittosporaceae and is endemic to Western Australia. It is a glabrous shrub or climber that has linear to oblong leaves with the edges curved upwards and large groups of flowers with widely spreading pale mauve petals that darken as they age.

== Description ==
Billardiera lehmanniana is a glabrous shrub or woody climber that has many short side branches, although it is often slow to develop a climbing habit. The adult leaves are linear to oblong, 25–28 mm (0.98–1.10 in) long and 6–13 mm (0.24–0.51 in) wide on a short petiole. The edges of the leaves curve upwards, the base of the leaves is stem-clasping. The flowers are arranged in panicles of many flowers with leaf-like bracts at the base. The sepals are greenish yellow, 3–4 mm (0.12–0.16 in) long and sparsely hairy. The petals are pale mauve pink, 10–12 mm (0.39–0.47 in) long, and widely spreading, darkening as they age. Flowering occurs from August to December and the mature fruit is a berry 5.5 mm (0.22 in) long, containing a few reddish-brown seeds.

== Taxonomy ==
Billardiera lehmanniana was first formally described in 1862 by Ferdinand von Mueller in The Plants Indigenous to the Colony of Victoria. Mueller considered B. lehmanniana to be synonym of Marianthus angustifolius, described by Alois (Aloys) Putterlick in Lehmann's Plantae Preissianae. The specific epithet (lehmanniana) honours Johann Georg Christian Lehmann.

== Distribution and habitat ==
Kurup grows around salt lakes, on river flats and on granite in the Avon Wheatbelt, Coolgardie, Esperance Plains, Jarrah Forest and Mallee bioregions of Western Australia.
