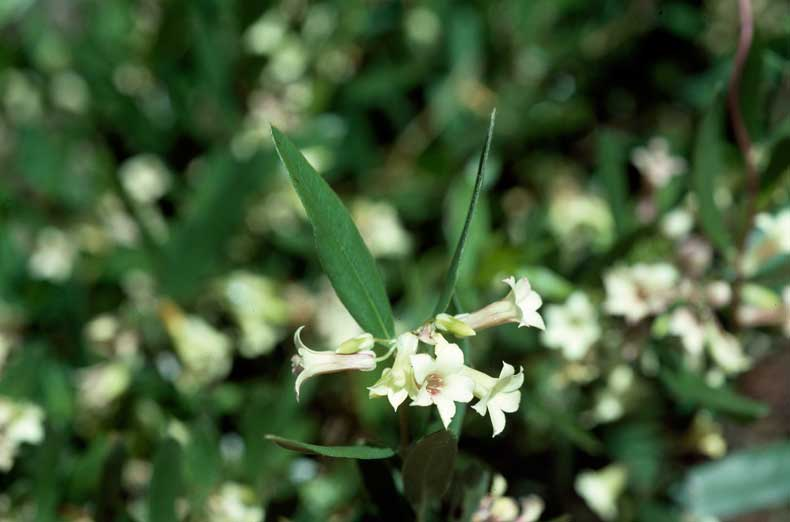
- In the Australian National Botanic Gardens

Scientific classification
- Kingdom: Plantae
- Clade: Tracheophytes
- Clade: Angiosperms
- Clade: Eudicots
- Clade: Asterids
- Order: Apiales
- Family: Pittosporaceae
- Genus: Billardiera
- Species: B. versicolor

Binomial name
- Billardiera versicolor F.Muell. ex Klatt
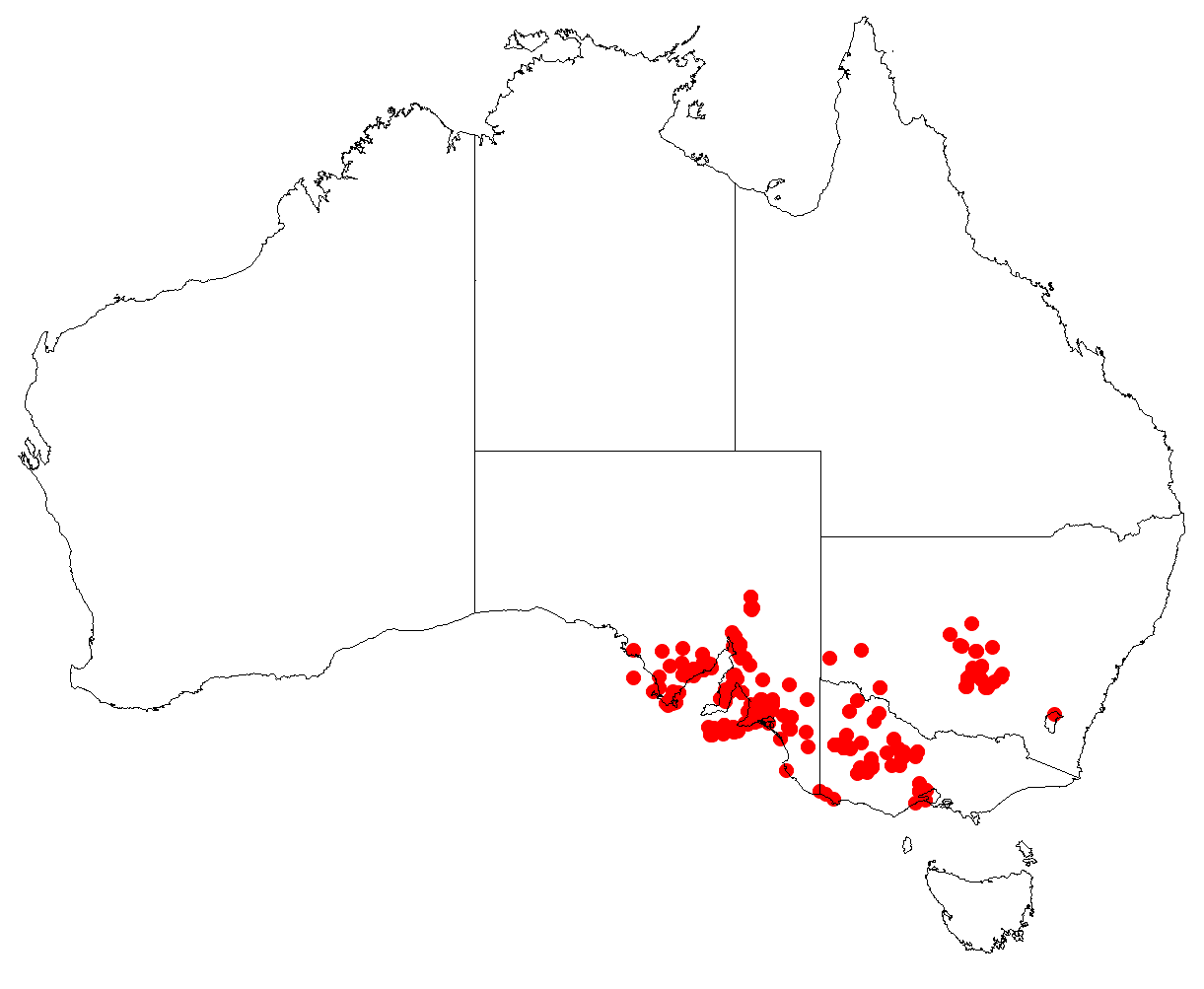
- Occurrence data from Australasian Virtual Herbarium

Synonyms
- Pronaya muelleriana Turcz.; Billardiera cymosa auct. non F.Muell.: Walsh, N.G. & Albrecht, D.E. in Walsh, N.G. & Entwisle, T.J. (ed.) (1996)

= Billardiera versicolor =

Apple berry

Species of flowering plant

Billardiera versicolor, commonly known as pale appleberry or sweet appleberry, is a species of flowering plant in the family Pittosporaceae and is endemic to south-eastern continental Australia. It is a robust, shrubby twiner or scrambler that has mostly narrowly elliptic or narrowly egg-shaped leaves and white, cream-coloured or pale yellow flowers with mauve-red blotches that spread as the flowers age.

== Description ==
Billardiera versicolor is robust, shrubby twiner or scrambler with stems up to several metres long. The adult leaves are more or less sessile, narrowly egg-shaped to narrowly elliptic, 25–60 mm (0.98–2.36 in) long and 4–15 mm (0.16–0.59 in) wide. The flowers are arranged in sessile groups of about five to twelve, each flower on a pedicel 10–12 mm (0.39–0.47 in) long. The sepals are yellowish-green and 2–3 mm (0.079–0.118 in) long and the petals white, cream-coloured or pale yellow, 10–12 mm (0.39–0.47 in) long, with mauve-red blotches that spread as the flower ages. Flowering mainly occurs from September to December and the mature fruit is a green berry 13–15 mm (0.51–0.59 in) long containing many seeds.

== Taxonomy and naming ==
Billardiera versicolor was first formally described in 1857 by Friedrich Wilhelm Klatt in the journal Linnaea from an unpublished description by Ferdinand von Mueller. The specific epithet (versicolor) means "variously coloured" or "changing colour".

== Distribution and habitat ==
This species of Billardiera mainly grows in mallee, but also in woodland and scrub, and occurs in western New South Wales, in the western half of Victoria and on the Eyre Peninsula and in the Flinders Ranges in South Australia.
