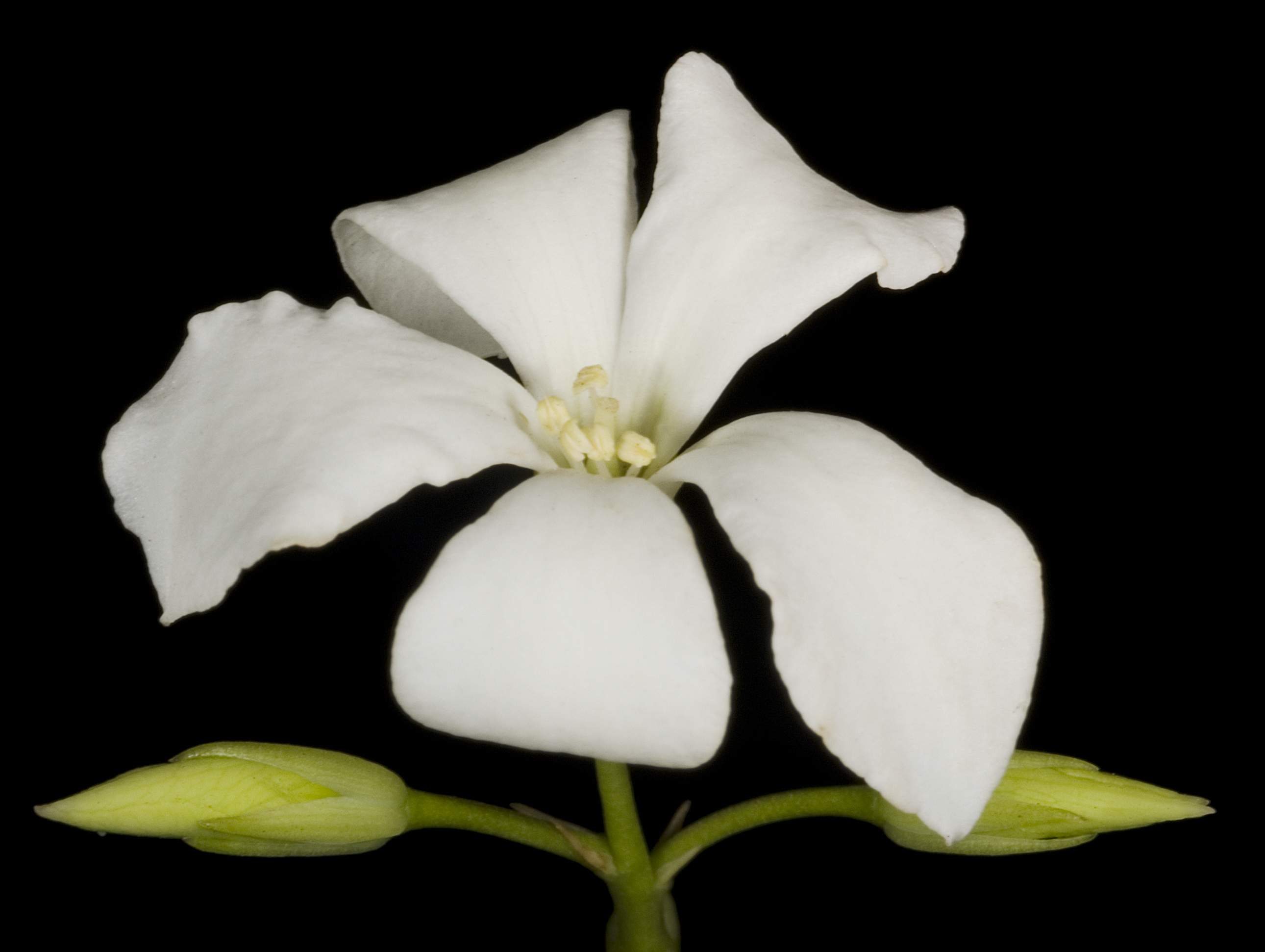

Scientific classification
- Kingdom: Plantae
- Clade: Tracheophytes
- Clade: Angiosperms
- Clade: Eudicots
- Clade: Asterids
- Order: Apiales
- Family: Pittosporaceae
- Genus: Billardiera
- Species: B. floribunda

Binomial name
- Billardiera floribunda (Putt.) F.Muell.
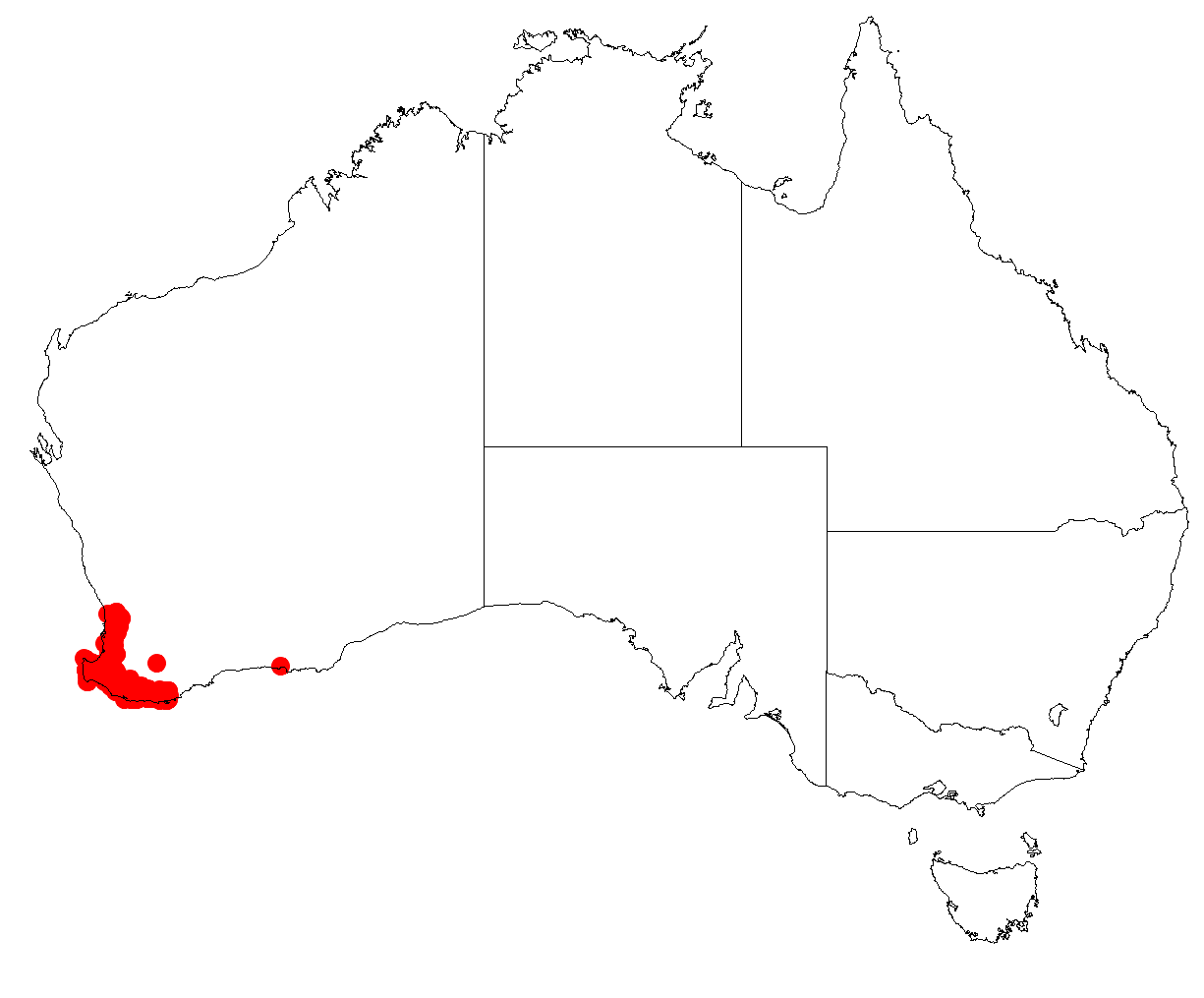
- Occurrence data from Australasian Virtual Herbarium

= Billardiera floribunda =

White-flowered billardiera

Species of plant

Billardiera floribunda, commonly known as white-flowered billardiera, is a species of flowering plant in the family Pittosporaceae and is endemic to the south-west of Western Australia. It is a robust twining shrub or climber that has thick, leathery, elliptic leaves and white or pinkish flowers arranged in groups of ten or more.

== Description ==
Billardiera floribunda is a robust, twining shrub or climber with glabrous, reddish-brown stems. The adult leaves are elliptic, thick and leathery, 44–117 mm (1.7–4.6 in) long and 20–60 mm (0.79–2.36 in) wide on a petiole up to 6 mm (0.24 in) long. The flowers are arranged in corymbs of ten or more, the sepals narrowly triangular and 6–8 mm (0.24–0.31 in) long. The petals are white or pale pink, turning pink as they age, 17–27 mm (0.67–1.06 in) long and spatula-shaped. Flowering occurs in summer and the mature fruit is a berry 20–25 mm (0.79–0.98 in) long.

== Taxonomy ==
White-flowered billardiera was first formally described in 1839 by Alois Putterlick who gave it the name Marianthus floribundus in Novarum Stirpium Decades. In 1882, Ferdinand von Mueller transferred the species to Billardiera as B. floribunda. The specific epithet (floribunda) means "flowering profusely".

== Distribution and habitat ==
White-flowered billardiera grows in forest and woodland from near Perth and south to Augusta then east to Albany and the Porongurups in the Jarrah Forest, Swan Coastal Plain and Warren bioregions of south-western Western Australia.
