= Lindy W. Cayzer =

Australian botanist

- Born: Lindy Webster; 25 April 1952 (age 73)
- Spouse: Robin Cayzer
- Scientific career
- Thesis: Revision of the family Pittosporaceae in Australia (1997)
- Doctoral advisors: Michael Crisp, Judith Gay West
- Author abbrev. (botany): L.W.Cayzer (IPNI); L.Cayzer(APNI)

Lindy Webster Cayzer CF (born 25 April 1952) is an Australian botanist.

The standard author abbreviation L.W.Cayzer is used to indicate this person as the author when citing a botanical name. (The Australian Plant Name Index consistently gives her author abbreviation as L.Cayzer.)

== Early life and education ==
Cayzer was born on 25 April 1952, daughter of Robert and Rita Webster. She graduated from the Australian National University with a PhD in 1997.

== Career ==
Cayzer was awarded a Churchill Fellowship in 2016 which enabled her to visit herbaria in Europe and South-East Asia to study the taxonomic data held on the Australian plant family Pittosporaceae. She was supported in this by her husband, Robin Cayzer.

She has continued to work on Australian plants, publishing further work on Pittosporaceae, a monograph on Gastrolobium, and more recently, a monograph on Daviesia, and work on insect pests in timber.

== Publications ==
- What's its name? : a concise list of plant names & name changes for Australia. Proteaceae. Cayzer, Lindy., Whitbread, Greg., Australian Biological Resources Study. Canberra: Australian Biological Resources Study. 2001. ISBN 0-642-56812-X. OCLC 48129338.

== See also ==
- Category:Taxa named by Lindy W. Cayzer
