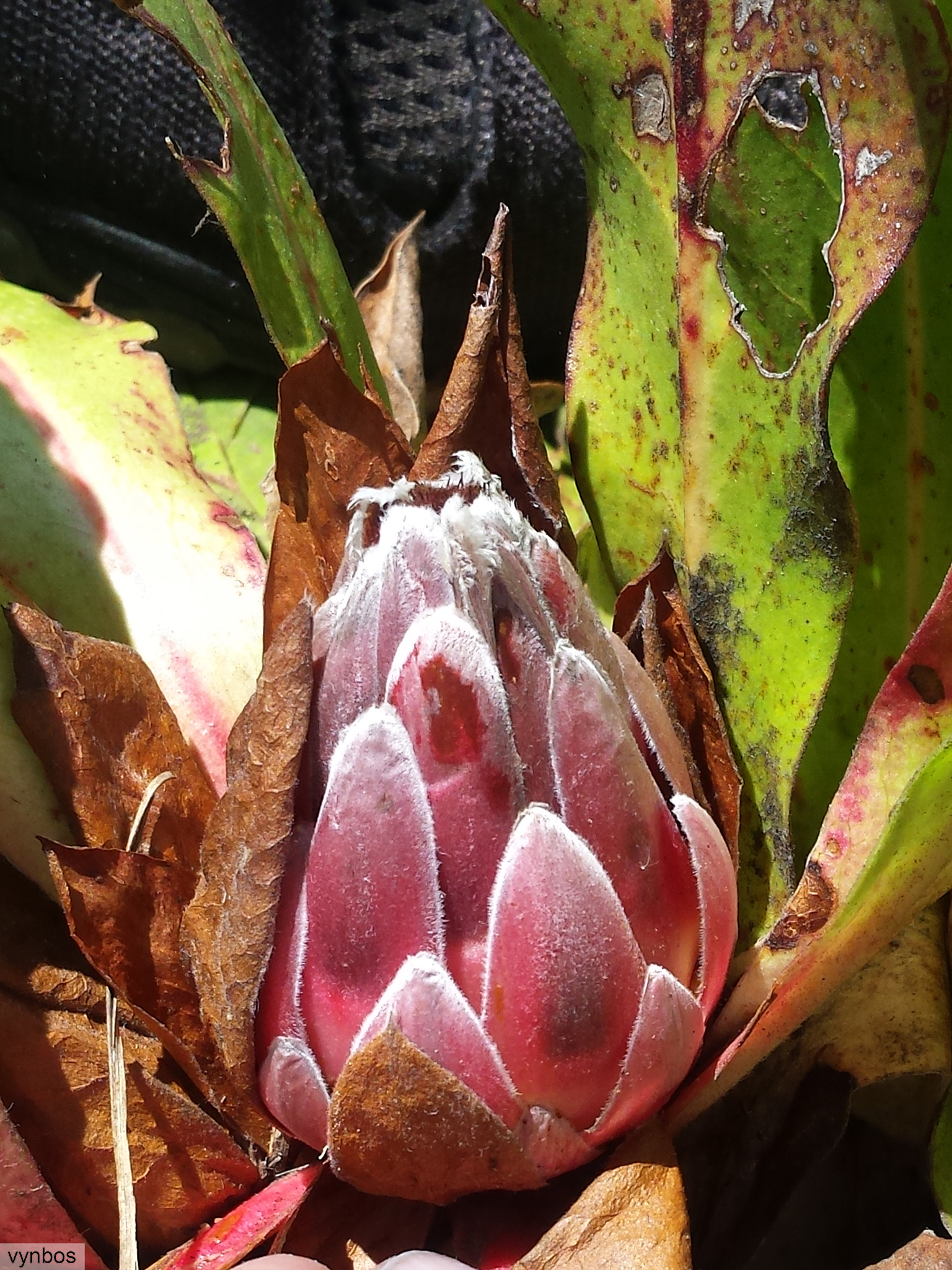

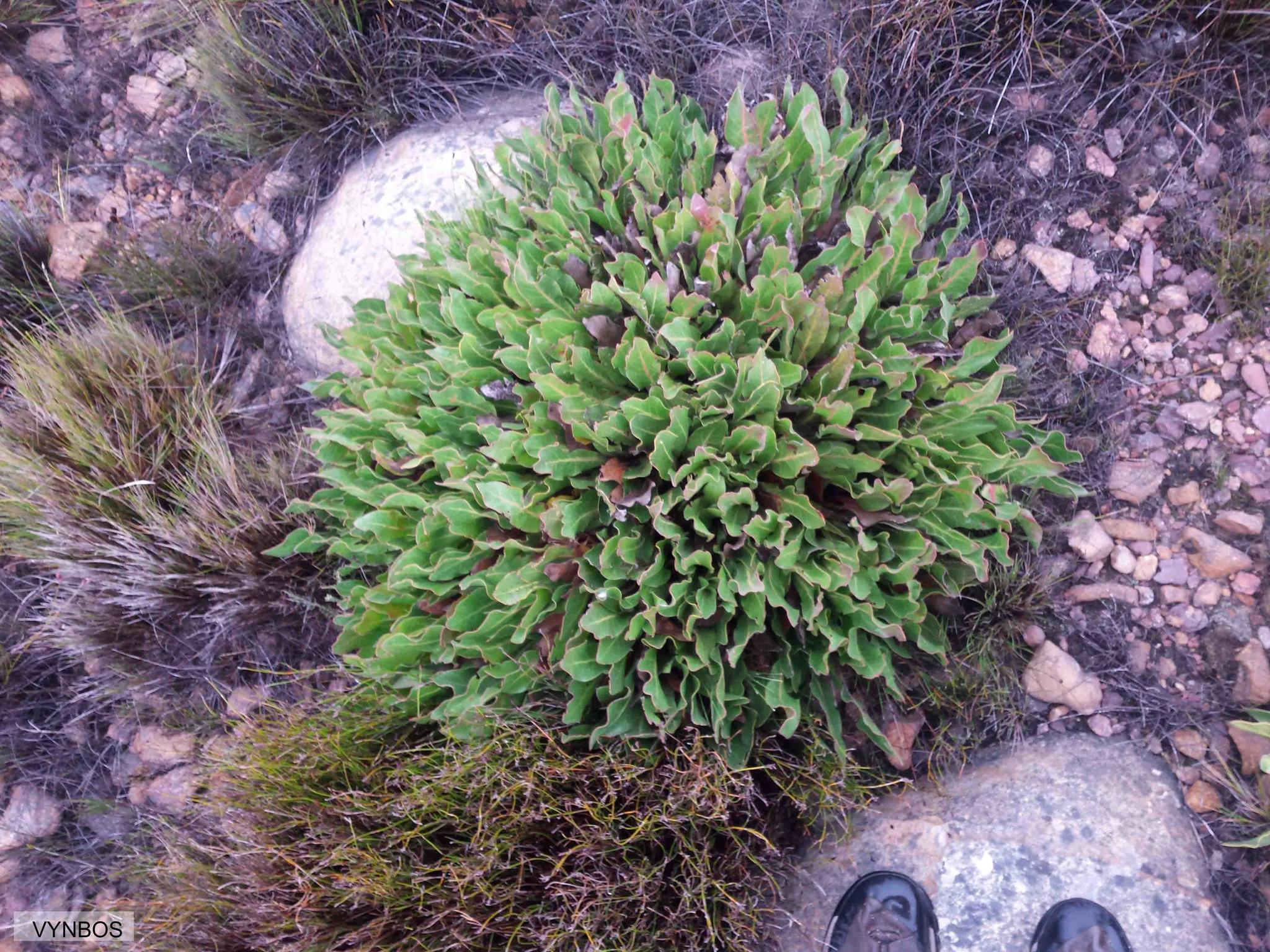

Conservation status
- Vulnerable (IUCN 3.1)

Scientific classification
- Kingdom: Plantae
- Clade: Tracheophytes
- Clade: Angiosperms
- Clade: Eudicots
- Order: Proteales
- Family: Proteaceae
- Genus: Protea
- Species: P. caespitosa

Binomial name
- Protea caespitosa Andrews

Synonyms
- Erodendrum turbiniflorum Salisb.; Erodendrum caespitosum Salisb. ex. Knight; Protea turbiniflora (Salisb.) R.Br.; Scolymocephalus turbiniflorus (Salisb.) Kuntze; Protea oleracea L.Guthrie

= Protea caespitosa =

Species of plant

Protea caespitosa, also known as hottentot bishop sugarbush or bishop sugarbush, is a flowering shrub belonging to the genus Protea which is only found growing in the wild in South Africa.

Other vernacular names which have been recorded for Protea caespitosa are dual-leaf protea and turfy erodendrum, or, in the Afrikaans language, biskopsuikerbos.

== Taxonomy ==
In his 1810 treatise On the Proteaceae of Jussieu, Robert Brown classified this species as Protea turbiniflora, thereby renaming the Erodendrum turbiniflorum first described by Richard Anthony Salisbury in The Paradisus Londinensis, and incorrectly sinking into synonymy the previously named Protea caespitosa, which had been described by Henry Cranke Andrews a few years before.

The South African botanist Louise Guthrie described P. oleracea in 1925 during her work at the Bolus Herbarium. The International Plant Names Index incorrectly attributes all of her species descriptions to her father, Francis Guthrie, who died 26 years before the publication of this name.

== Description ==
It is a rounded shrub which can grow up 70 to 100 centimeters (28 to 39 inches) in height, but individuals are usually found as much shorter plants which form cushions of up to 20 centimeters (7.9 inches) high. The plant is monoecious with both sexes in each flower.

The leaves are somewhat variable: some populations have plants with more lanceolate leaves, but there is also a form with very broad leaves.

Seedlings have been confused with Protea acaulos in the field, but when the plant is flowering or fruiting, the brown-coloured leaves around the base of the inflorescence are unique.

== Distribution ==
The plant is endemic to the southwest of the Western Cape, South Africa. It occurs at high altitudes in the Cape Fold mountain ranges, from the Slanghoek and Du Toit Mountains, through the Hottentots Holland, to the mountain ranges of Kogelberg and western Riviersonderend. Protea caespitosa has a restricted range. Different subpopulations can fluctuate in abundance due to the action of wildfires.

== Ecology ==
Mature individuals are killed by wildfires, and only the seeds survive.

The plant flowers in from mid-winter to the start of summer, from July to November. It can flower at two years old. There is only a single record of a pollinator, a mammal (rodent), although it may also be pollinated by birds. The seeds are retained in the persistent, dry-fruited, fire-resistant inflorescences for a few years, and are released after fires. The seeds are eventually dispersed by means of the wind.

The habitat in which it can be found is typically on the summits of mountains in a substrate of Cederberg shale, and here it appears to prefer growing in deeper soils. It is also often found growing in sandstone regions. It often occurs in dense stands. It grows at altitudes of 820 to 1,500 meters (2,690 to 4,920 feet), although most records are from some 1,400 to 1,720 meters (4,590 to 5,640 ft).

== Conservation ==
Although it was considered 'not threatened' in the past (following Hilton-Taylor (1996)), and dense stands exist, the South African National Biodiversity Institute classed it as 'vulnerable' in 2019.

There are no severe threats. It can be considered well-conserved: as of 2008, 96% of the population is protected in nature reserves, for example in the Kogelberg Biosphere Reserve in the Western Cape.
