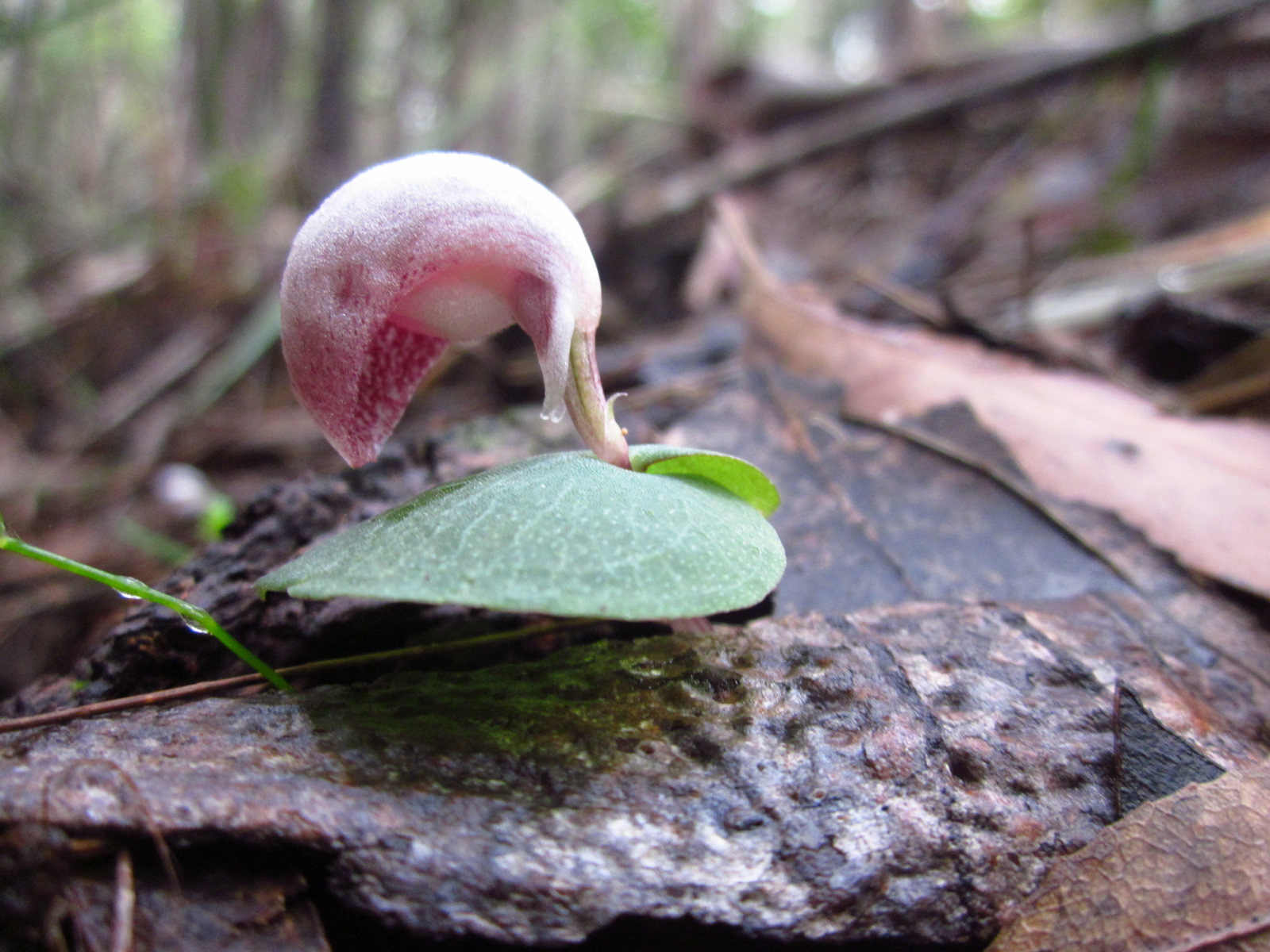
- Corybas aconitiflorus near Minyon Falls

Scientific classification
- Kingdom: Plantae
- Clade: Tracheophytes
- Clade: Angiosperms
- Clade: Monocots
- Order: Asparagales
- Family: Orchidaceae
- Subfamily: Orchidoideae
- Tribe: Diurideae
- Genus: Corybas
- Species: C. aconitiflorus

Binomial name
- Corybas aconitiflorus Salisb.

Synonyms
- Corysanthes aconitiflorus (Salisb.) Druce; Corysanthes bicalcarata R.Br.

= Corybas aconitiflorus =

Cradle orchid

Species of orchid

Corybas aconitiflorus, commonly known as the cradle orchid or spurred helmet orchid, is a species of terrestrial orchid endemic to eastern Australia, occurring from south-east Queensland to Tasmania. The small flowers have a hooded appearance as the uppermost sepal hides most of the rest of the flower. It is the type species of the genus Corybas.

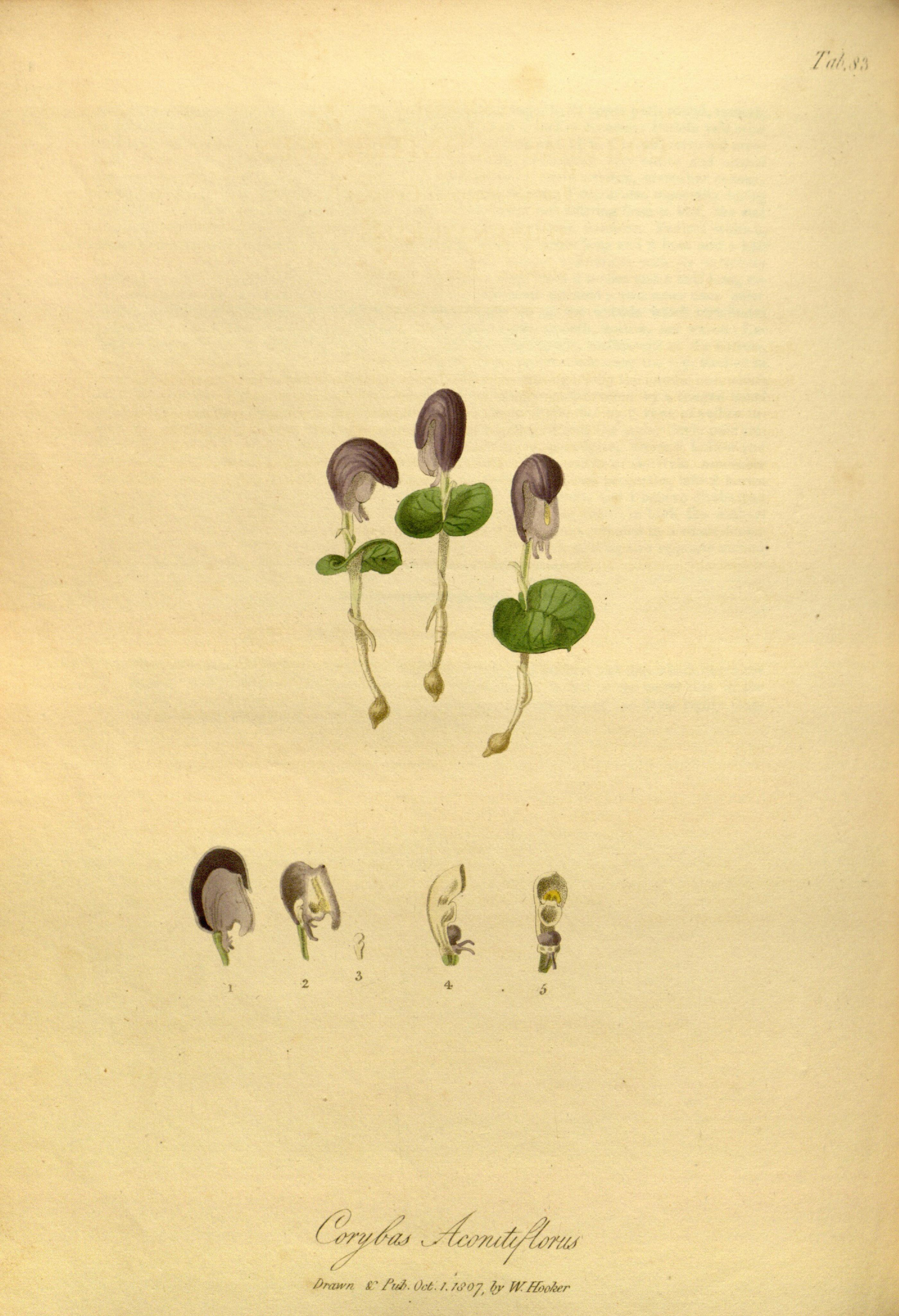
Hooker's illustration in The Paradisus Londinensis: 1 – flower, half of the upper sepal cut away; 2 – half of the labellum showing one of the nectaries near the base; 3 – column, natural size; 4,5 – side and front view of the column magnified

== Description ==
Corybas aconitiflorus grows from a pair of small tubers, to which it dies down in the dormant season. The stems are short and upright, with generally a single flat, smooth, basal leaf. The leaf is dark green on the upper surface, purplish below, egg-shaped to heart-shaped, 15–35 mm (0.6–1 in) long and 10–30 mm (0.4–1 in) wide. The single greyish to reddish purple flower leans forward and is 25–30 mm (0.98–1.2 in) long and 10–12 mm (0.4–0.5 in) wide. The hooded dorsal sepal is 22–30 mm (0.9–1 in) long, 10–12 mm (0.4–0.5 in) wide and covers and hides most of the rest of the flower. The lateral sepals and petals are 1 or 2 mm (0.04 or 0.08 in) long and similar in appearance to each other. The labellum is much smaller than the petals and lateral sepals and is undivided, with its margins turned inwards. The thin column is wider at the base and has fused wings along its body. There are terminal persistent pollen masses (pollinia), cream in colour, fixed directly to the viscidia (sticky pads which adhere to pollinators). The flower is pollinated by fungus gnats but otherwise little is known about the pollination mechanism because the flower is hidden by the dorsal sepal and the species is difficult to cultivate.

== Taxonomy ==
Corybas aconitiflorus was first formally described by Richard Salisbury in The Paradisus Londinensis in 1807, where it was illustrated by William Hooker. This was also the source of the genus name Corybas. Both the genus name and the specific epithet refer to the shape of the flower. Corybas is derived from the Greek Κορύβας (Korybas), a male dancer who worshipped the goddess Cybele, shown in illustrations wearing a crested helmet. The specific epithet aconitiflorus means "with a flower like Aconitum (monkshood)".

In 2002, David Jones, Mark Clements and others proposed splitting Corybas into eight smaller genera including Corybas, Anzybas, Corysanthes and Nematoceras. However, because Corybas aconitiflorus is the type species of the genus, it will remain in Corybas.

== Distribution and habitat ==
The cradle orchid grows in heath and forest, mostly in coastal and near coastal districts. It occurs in Queensland south from Gympie, in eastern New South Wales and in south-eastern Victoria with isolated populations in the west of the state. It also occurs in the north and east of Tasmania.
