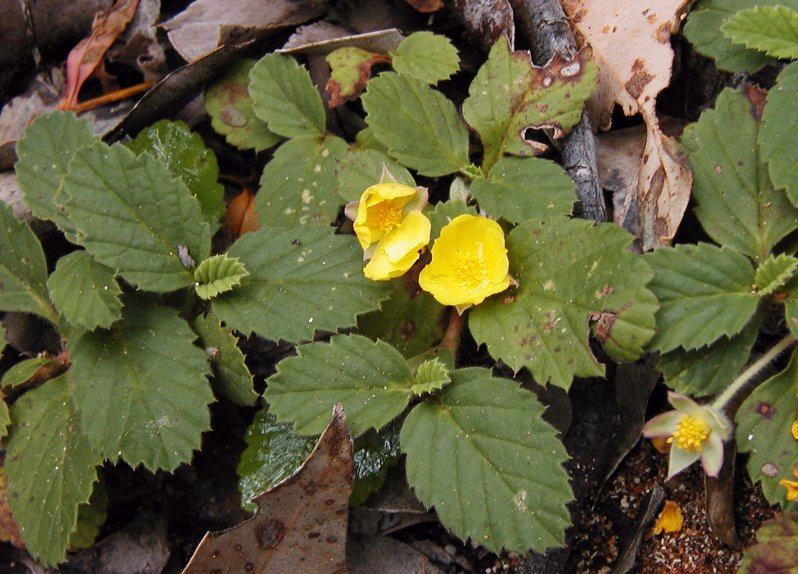
- Hibbertia grossulariifolia near Mammoth Cave

Scientific classification
- Kingdom: Plantae
- Clade: Tracheophytes
- Clade: Angiosperms
- Clade: Eudicots
- Order: Dilleniales
- Family: Dilleniaceae
- Genus: Hibbertia
- Species: H. grossulariifolia

Binomial name
- Hibbertia grossulariifolia (Salisb.) Salisb.

Synonyms
- List: Burtonia crenata (Andrews) Rchb.; Burtonia grossulariaefolia Salisb. orth. var.; Burtonia grossulariifolia Salisb.; Dillenia crenata (Andrews) Dum.Cours.; Dillenia grossulariaefolia (Salisb.) Poir. orth. var.; Dillenia grossulariifolia (Salisb.) Poir.; Hibbertia crenata Andrews; Hibbertia grossulariaefolia Salisb. orth. var.; Hibbertia grossularifolia F.Muell. orth. var.

= Hibbertia grossulariifolia =

Species of flowering plant

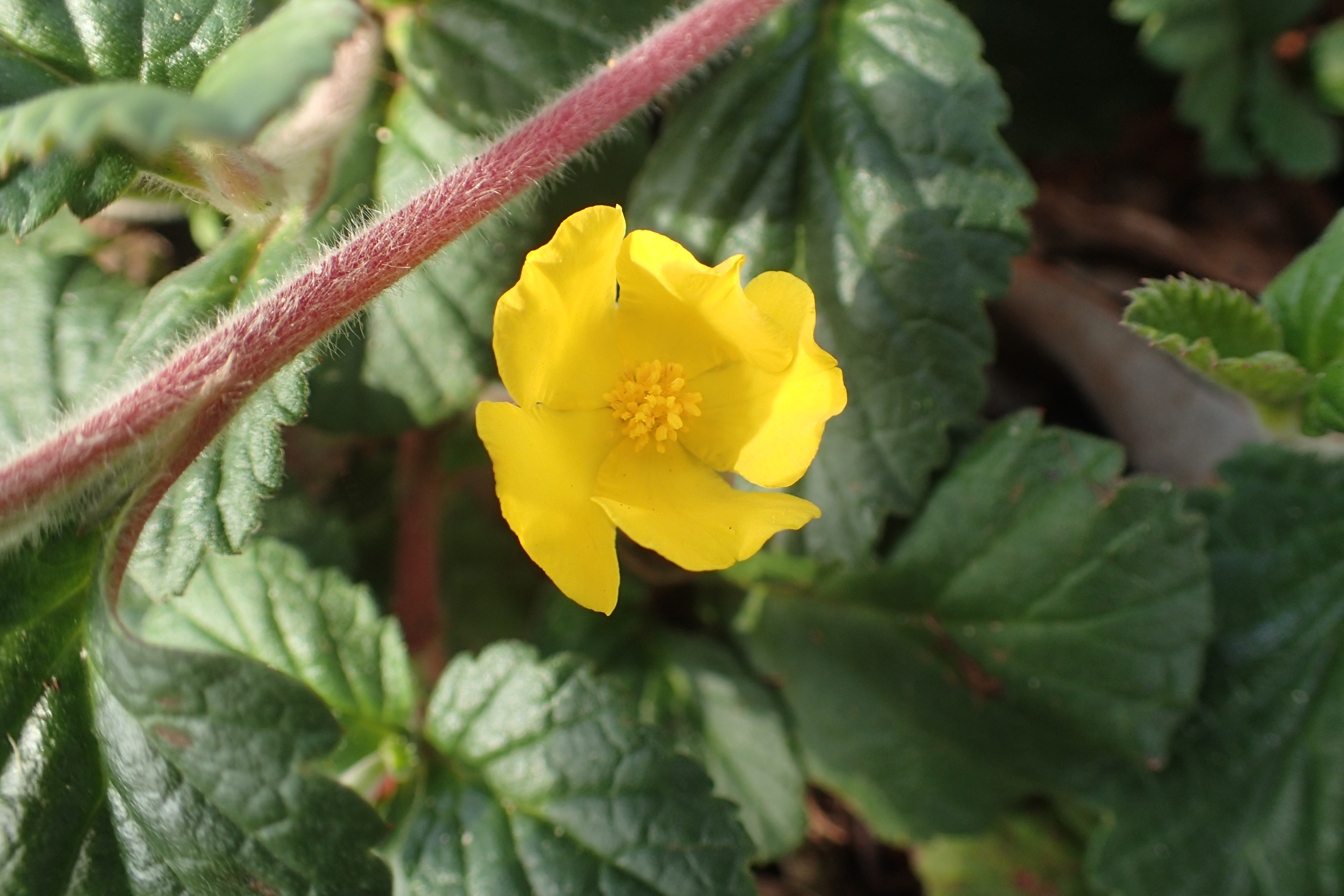
Flower detail

Hibbertia grossulariifolia is a species of flowering plant in the family Dilleniaceae and is endemic to the south-west of Western Australia. It is a prostrate shrub that spreads up to 1.2 m (3 ft 11 in) in diameter and has yellow flowers that appear between August and December in the species' native range.

The species was first formally described in 1807 by English botanist Richard Salisbury and was given the name Burtonia grossulariaefolia in The Paradisus Londinensis. Later in the same year, Salisbury changed the name to Hibbertia grossulariifolia. The specific epithet (grossulariifolia) means "Grossularia-leaved".
