= Hooker (surname) =

Hooker is a surname, originally indicating someone who made hooks or an agricultural worker who used hooks. Notable people with the surname include:

- Amani Hooker (born 1998), American football player
- Brad Hooker (born 1957), English philosopher
- Cameron Hooker (born 1953), American man sentenced to prison for 105 years for the kidnapping of Colleen Stan
- Charles E. Hooker (1825–1914), U.S. Representative from Mississippi
- Dan Hooker (born 1990), New Zealand mixed martial artist
- Destinee Hooker (born 1987), American volleyball player
- Earl Hooker (1929–1970), American blues guitarist
- Elon Huntington Hooker (1869–1938), American entrepreneur
- Evelyn Hooker (1907–1996), American psychologist
- Fair Hooker (born 1947), American professional football player
- Frank A. Hooker (1844–1911), American jurist
- Gary Hooker (1957–2024), American basketball player
- George Hooker (rugby league), Australian rugby league footballer
- George Hooker (cricketer) (1836–1877), English cricketer
- George W. Hooker (1838–1902), American military officer and politician
- H. Lester Hooker (1921–1999), American college sports coach
- Hendon Hooker (born 1998), American football player
- Henrietta Hooker (1851–1929), American botanist
- Henry Hooker (1828–1907), American Old West rancher
- Isabella Beecher Hooker (1822–1907), American suffragette leader
- Jake Hooker (journalist) (born 1973), American Pulitzer Prize-winning journalist
- James Hooker (disambiguation)
- Janusz Hooker (born 1969), Australian businessman
- Jeff Hooker (born 1965), American retired soccer player and current coach
- John Hooker (English constitutionalist) (c. 1527 – 1601), English writer, solicitor, antiquary, civic administrator and advocate of republican government
- John Daggett Hooker (1838–1911), social leader, amateur scientist and astronomer, donor of Hooker Telescope
- John Lee Hooker (1917–2001), American blues musician
- Johnny Hooker (born 1987), Brazilian rock/MPB musician
- Joseph Hooker (1814–1879), American Civil War major general
- Joseph Dalton Hooker (1817–1911), English botanist, son of William Jackson Hooker
- Katharine Putnam Hooker (1849–1935), American writer, philanthropist and socialite
- Leslie Joseph Hooker (1903–1976), Australian property entrepreneur, businessman and philanthropist
- Malik Hooker (born 1996), American football player
- Marjorie Hooker (1908–1976), American geologist
- Morna Hooker (born 1931), British theologian and New Testament scholar
- Olivia Hooker (1915–2018), United States Coast Guard officer and psychologist
- Philip Hooker (1766–1836), American architect
- Quinton Hooker (born 1995), American basketball player in the Israeli Basketball Premier League
- Reginald Hawthorn Hooker (1867–1944), English statistician, son of Joseph Dalton Hooker
- Richard Hooker (1554–1600), Anglican theologian
- Richard Hooker (author), pseudonym of H. Richard Hornberger (1924–1997), American writer and surgeon
- Robbie Hooker (born 1967), Australian footballer and football manager
- Ron Hooker (1935–2019), English former cricketer
- S. Percy Hooker (1860–1915), American politician from New York and New Hampshire
- Stanley Hooker (1907–1984), English aviation engineer
- Steve Hooker (born 1982), Australian pole vaulter
- Thomas Hooker (1586–1647), Puritan leader
- T J Hooker fictional character portrayed by William Shatner
- William Hooker (musician) (born 1946), American jazz drummer and composer
- William Hooker (botanical illustrator) (1779–1832), known for Hooker's Green
- William Jackson Hooker (1785–1865), English botanist, father of Joseph Dalton Hooker
- Worthington Hooker (1806–1867), American physician
- Hooker (Kent cricketer), 18th century English cricketer
