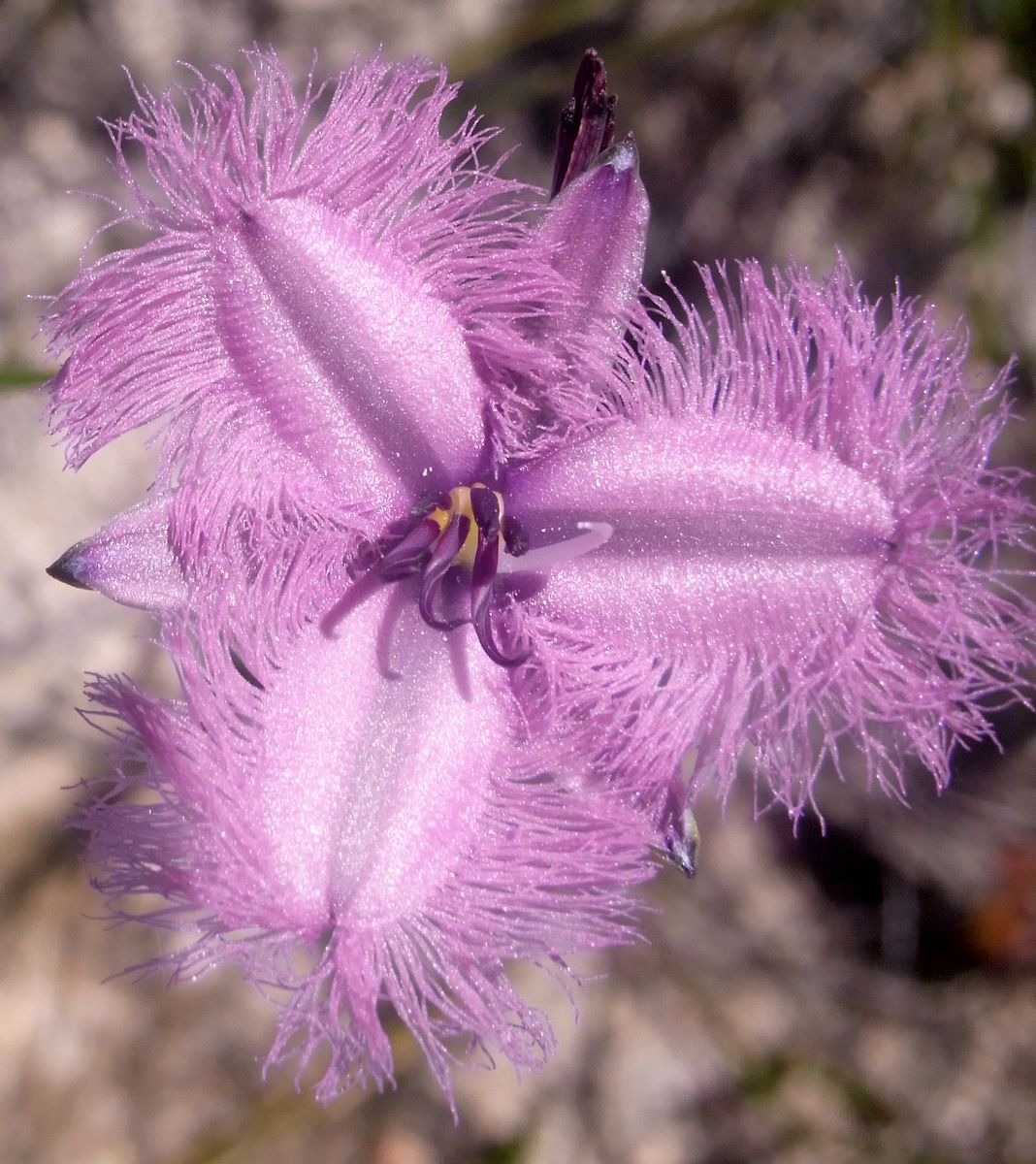
- In Ku-ring-gai Chase National Park

Scientific classification
- Kingdom: Plantae
- Clade: Tracheophytes
- Clade: Angiosperms
- Clade: Monocots
- Order: Asparagales
- Family: Asparagaceae
- Subfamily: Lomandroideae
- Genus: Thysanotus
- Species: T. juncifolius

Binomial name
- Thysanotus juncifolius (Salisb.) J.H.Willis & Court

= Thysanotus juncifolius =

Branching fringe-lily

Species of plant

Thysanotus juncifolius, commonly known as branching fringe lily, is a species of flowering plant in the Asparagaceae family, and is endemic to Australia. It is a herb with a small horizontal rhizome and fibrous roots, up to three linear leaves, and flowering stems with up to five umbels of pink to mauve flowers with spreading perianth segments, fringed petals and six stamens.

== Description ==
Thysanotus juncifolius is a herb with a horizontal rhizome 10–30 mm (0.39–1.18 in) long and fibrous roots, that typically grows to a height of up to about 60 cm (24 in). It has up to three linear leaves 60–250 mm (2.4–9.8 in) long, produced annually or occasionally absent. The flowering stems are striated, 15–65 cm (5.9–25.6 in) long, sometimes with two or three branches with up to five pink to mauve flowers in up to five umbels on the ends, each flower on a pedicel 6–11.5 mm (0.24–0.45 in) long. The tepals are 10–14 mm (0.39–0.55 in) long, the sepals 1.5–2 mm (0.059–0.079 in) wide and the petals 4–5 mm (0.16–0.20 in) wide with a fringe up to 3.0–4.5 mm (0.12–0.18 in) long. There are six stamens shorter than the petals, the three outer anthers straight and 2–3 mm (0.079–0.118 in) long and the inner anthers curved, 6–8 mm (0.24–0.31 in) long. Flowering occurs from September to March, and the fruit is a capsule about 4 mm (0.16 in) in diameter containing cylindrical seeds 1.5 mm (0.059 in) long and 1 mm (0.039 in) in diameter with a yellowish aril.

== Taxonomy ==
This species was first described in 1808 by Richard Anthony Salisbury, who gave it the name Chlamysporum juncifolium in The Paradisus Londinensis. In 1955, James Hamlyn Willis and Arthur Bertram Court transferred the species to Thysanotus as T. juncifolius in the journal Muelleria.

== Distribution and habitat ==
Thysanotus juncifolius grows in a range of habitats from tall forest to open mallee and heath, in sandy gravel and shallow loam to deep sand and gravel in south-eastern Queensland, coastal regions near Sydney and inland to the Blue Mountains, the far east of Victoria, and Ninety Mile Desert, Fleurieu and Eyre Peninsulas and Kangaroo Island of South Australia.
