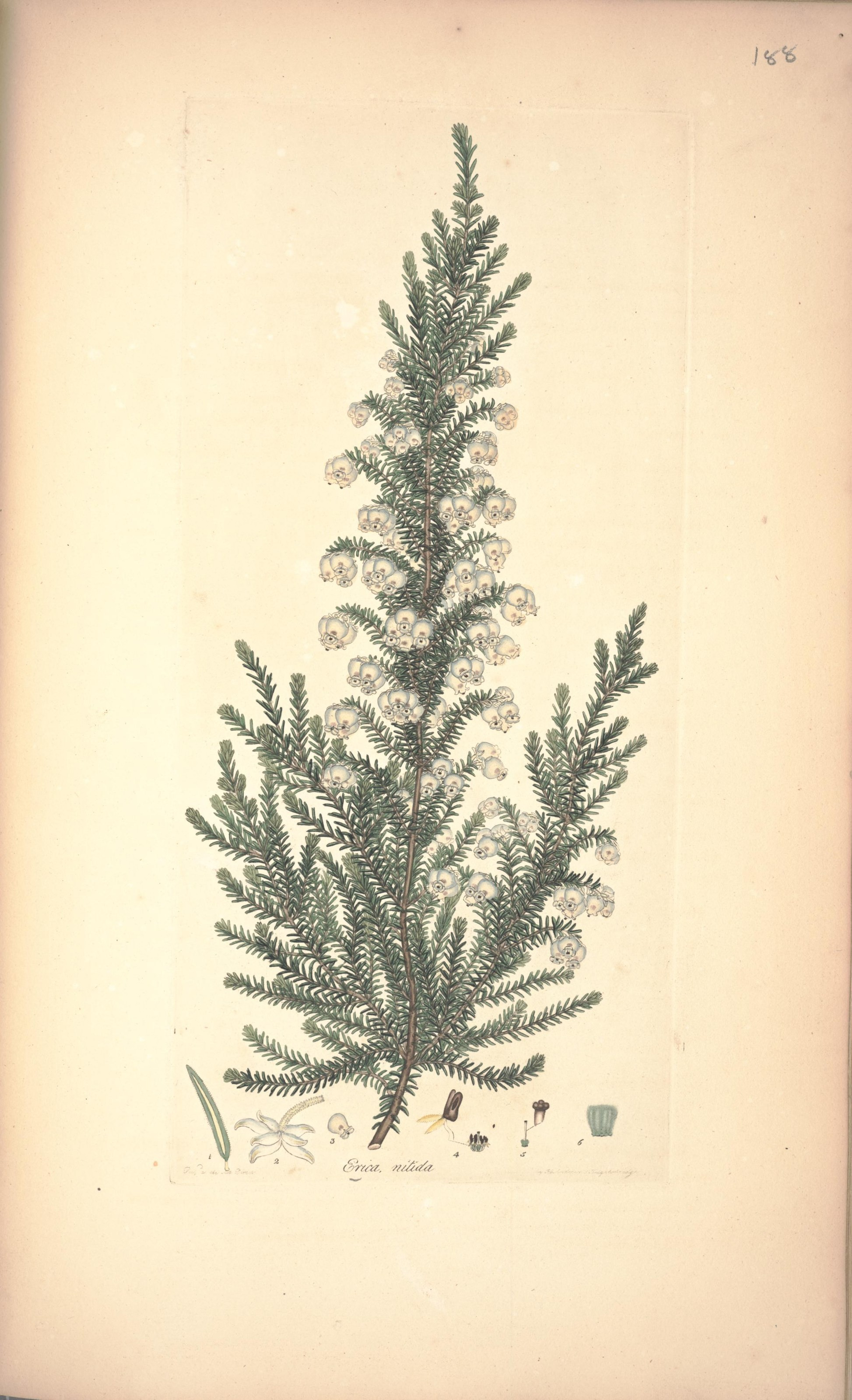

Scientific classification
- Kingdom: Plantae
- Clade: Tracheophytes
- Clade: Angiosperms
- Clade: Eudicots
- Clade: Asterids
- Order: Ericales
- Family: Ericaceae
- Genus: Erica
- Species: E. tragulifera

Binomial name
- Erica tragulifera Salisb.

Synonyms
- Erica gordonia J.Forbes; Erica nitida Andrews; Ericoides nitidum (Andrews) Kuntze; Ericoides traguliferum Kuntze

= Erica tragulifera =

Species of flowering plant

Erica tragulifera, the Kamanassie white heath, is a plant belonging to the genus Erica. The species is endemic to the Western Cape.
