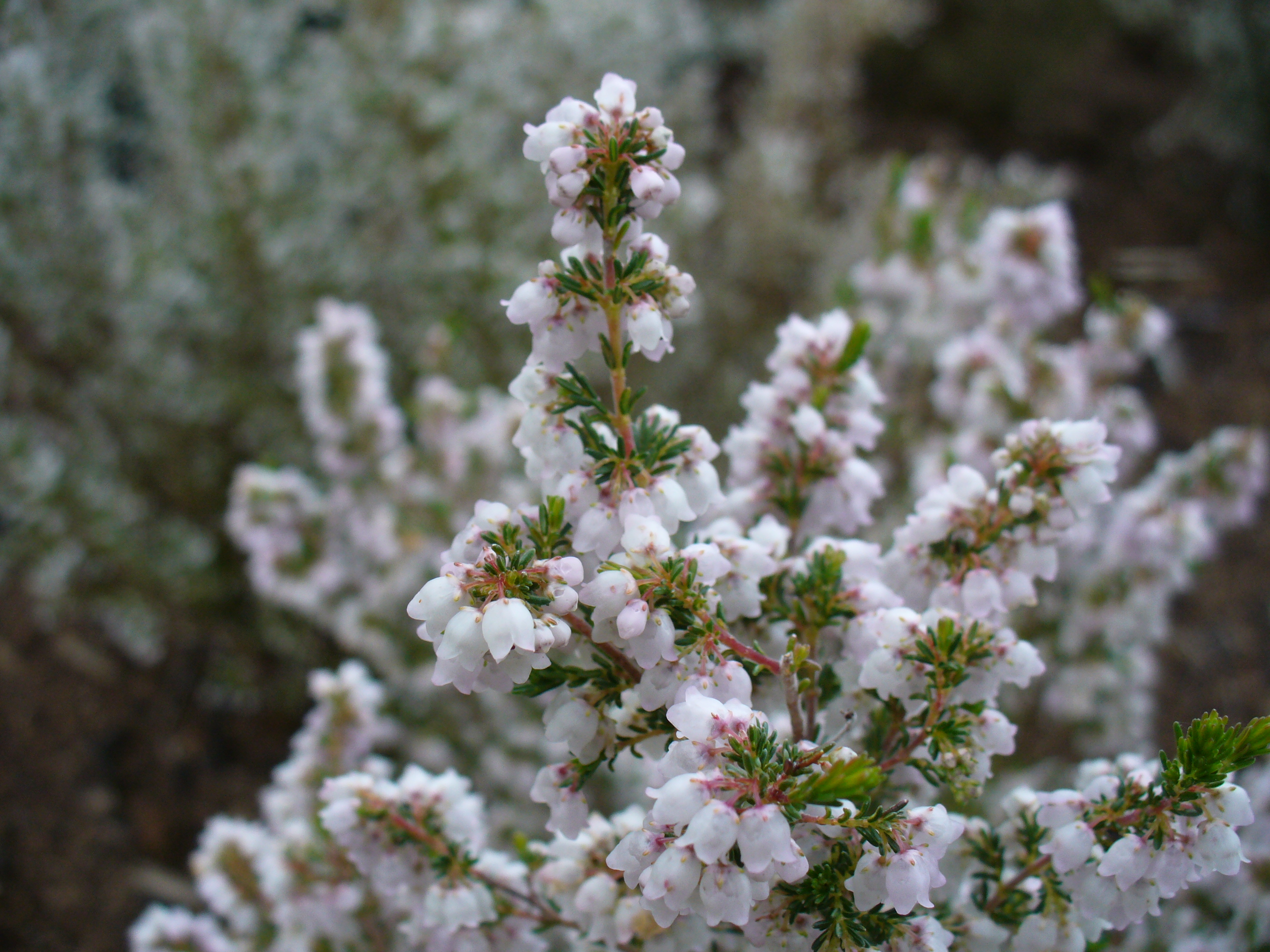

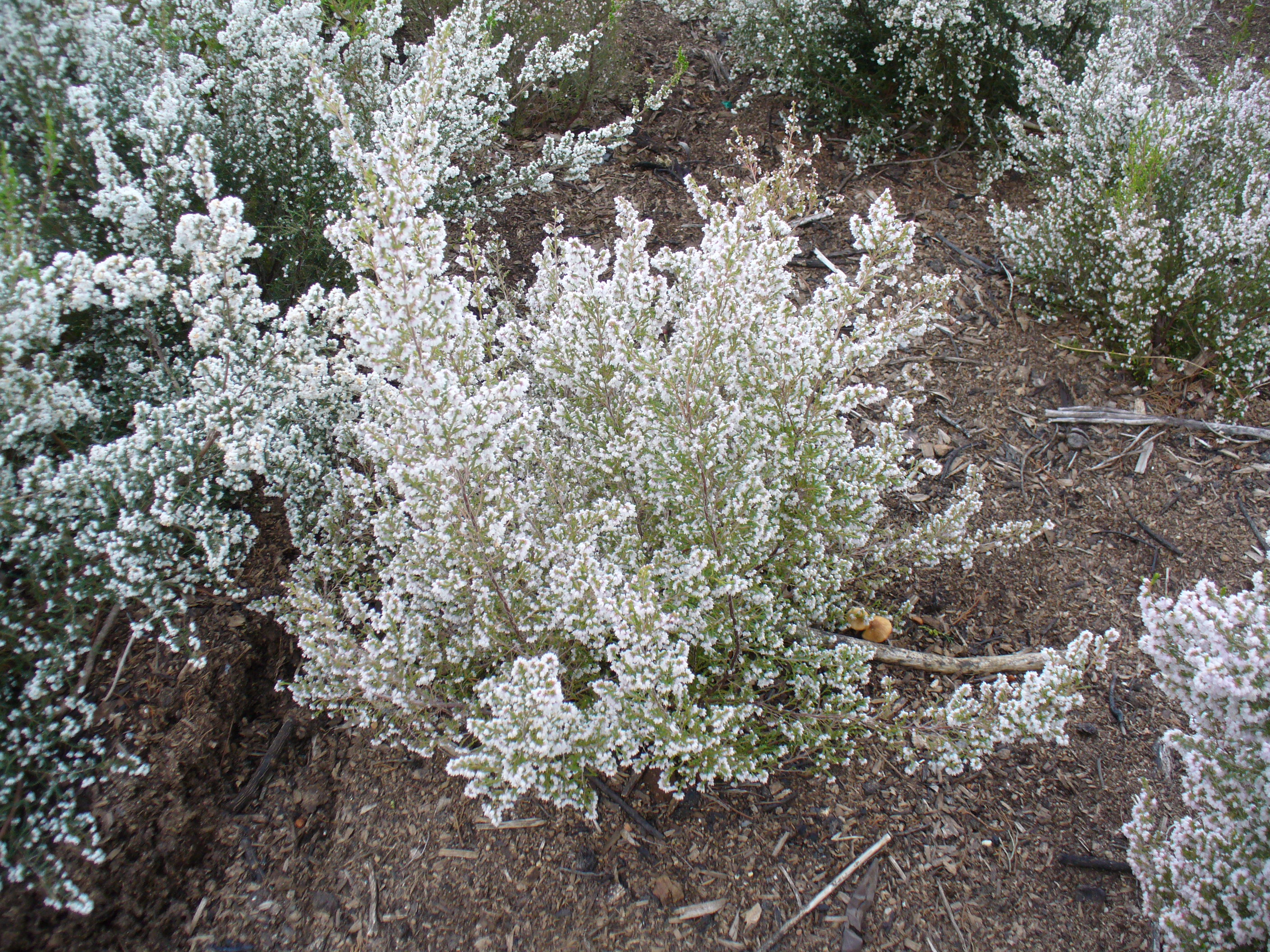

Scientific classification
- Kingdom: Plantae
- Clade: Tracheophytes
- Clade: Angiosperms
- Clade: Eudicots
- Clade: Asterids
- Order: Ericales
- Family: Ericaceae
- Genus: Erica
- Species: E. quadrangularis

Binomial name
- Erica quadrangularis Salisb., (1796)

Synonyms
- Erica minutissima Klotzsch ex Benth.; Erica quadriflora Salisb.; Ericoides minutissimum (Klotzsch ex Benth.) Kuntze; Ericoides quadriflorum Kuntze

= Erica quadrangularis =

Species of flowering plant

Erica quadrangularis is a plant belonging to the genus Erica. The species is endemic to the Western Cape.
