= George Hooker =

George Hooker may refer to:

- George Hooker (rugby league), Australian rugby league player
- George Hooker (cricketer) (1836–1877), English cricketer
- George W. Hooker (1838–1902), American Civil War officer and Medal of Honor recipient
