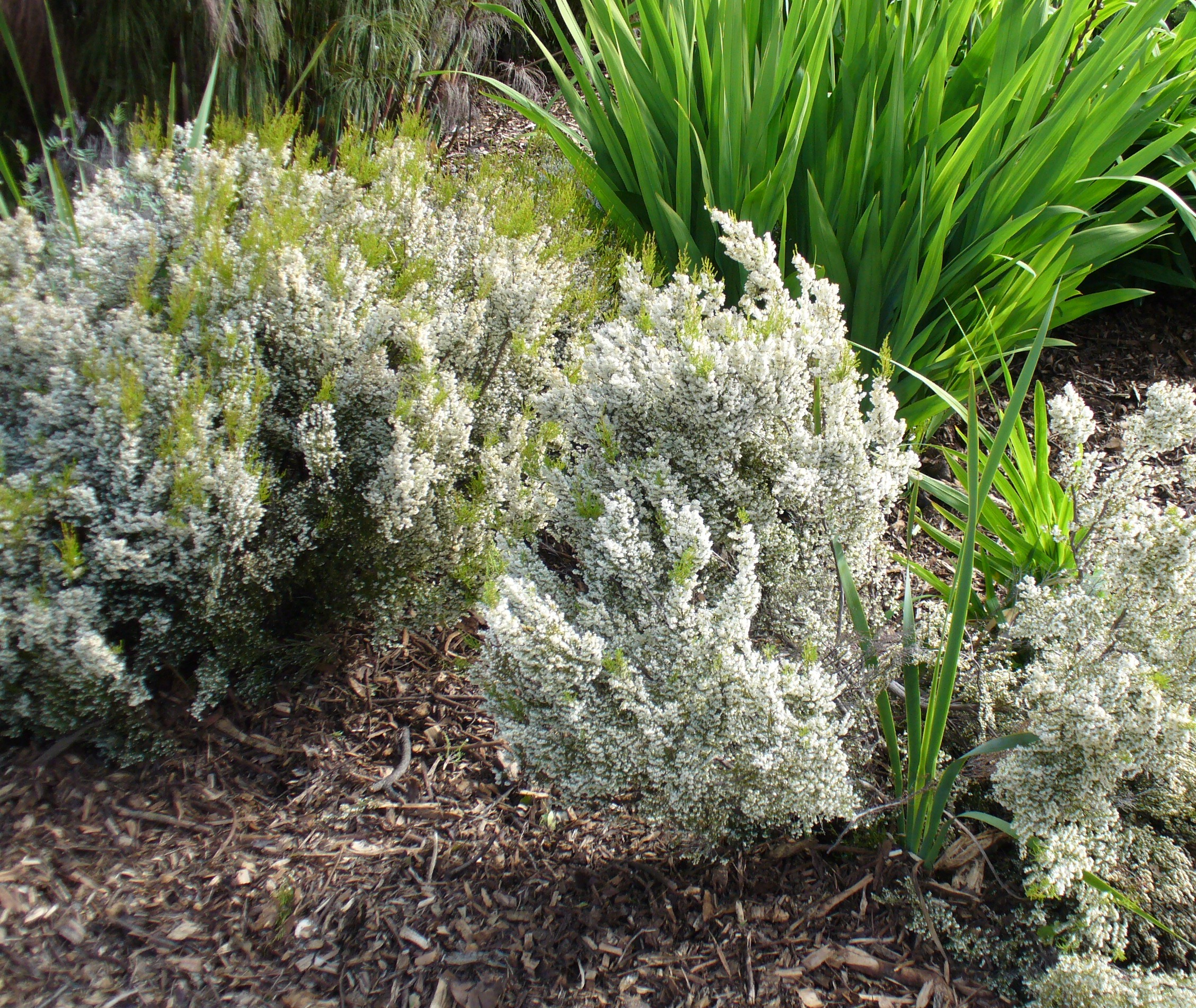

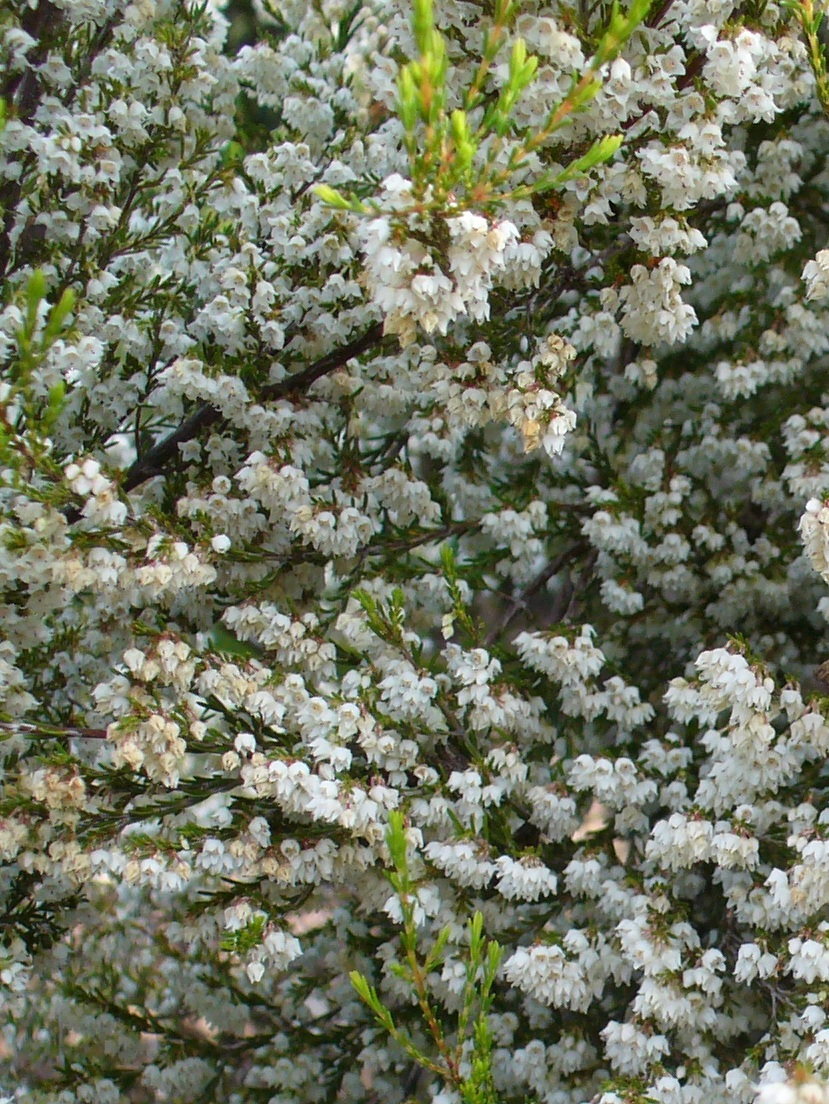

Scientific classification
- Kingdom: Plantae
- Clade: Tracheophytes
- Clade: Angiosperms
- Clade: Eudicots
- Clade: Asterids
- Order: Ericales
- Family: Ericaceae
- Genus: Erica
- Species: E. tenuis

Binomial name
- Erica tenuis Salisb.

Synonyms
- Erica capillaris Drège ex Benth.; Erica longifissa Klotzsch ex Benth.

= Erica tenuis =

Species of flowering plant

Erica tenuis is a plant belonging to the genus Erica. The species is endemic to the Eastern Cape and Western Cape.
