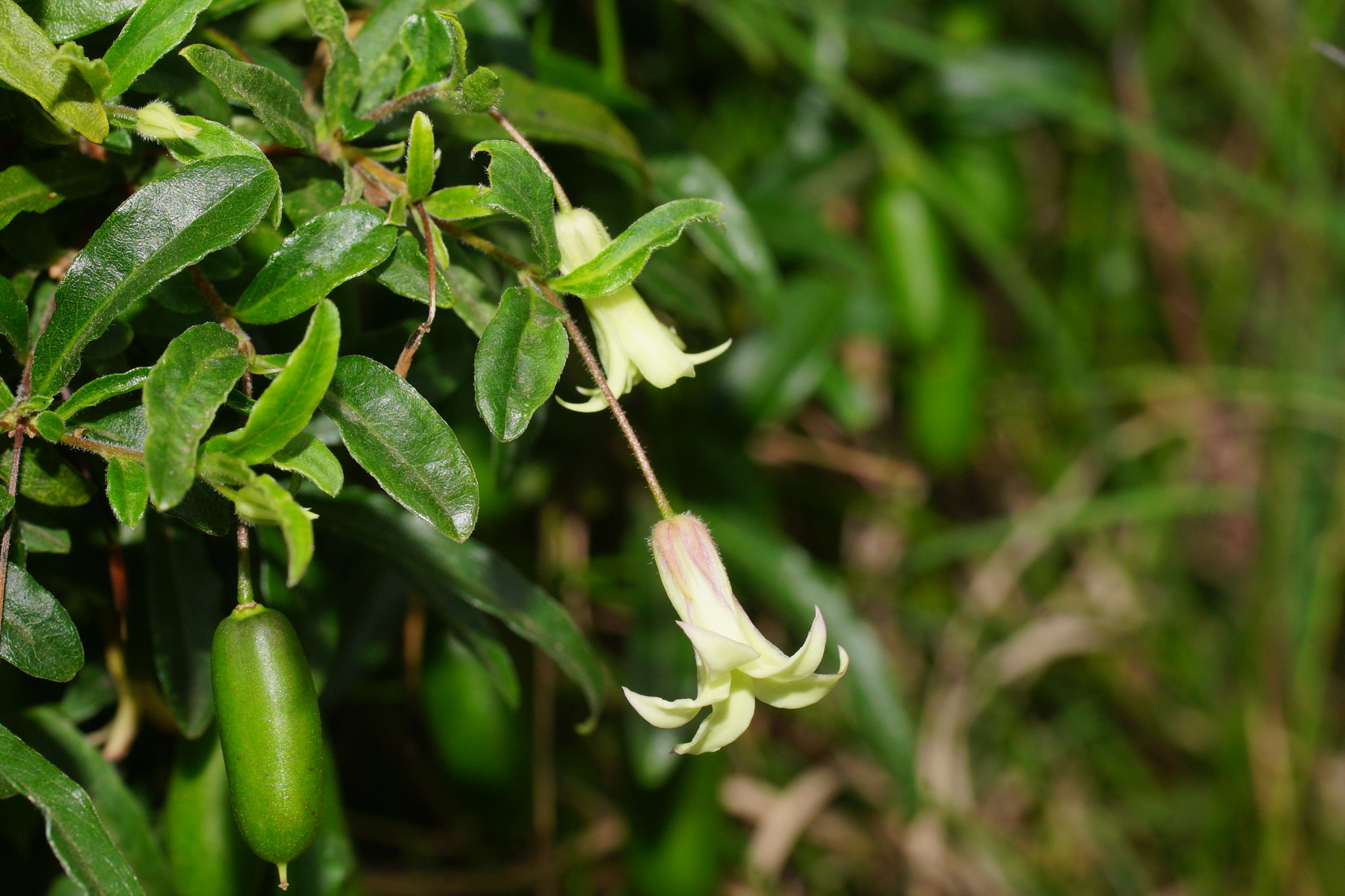
- In Bittern, Victoria

Scientific classification
- Kingdom: Plantae
- Clade: Tracheophytes
- Clade: Angiosperms
- Clade: Eudicots
- Clade: Asterids
- Order: Apiales
- Family: Pittosporaceae
- Genus: Billardiera
- Species: B. mutabilis

Binomial name
- Billardiera mutabilis Salisb.
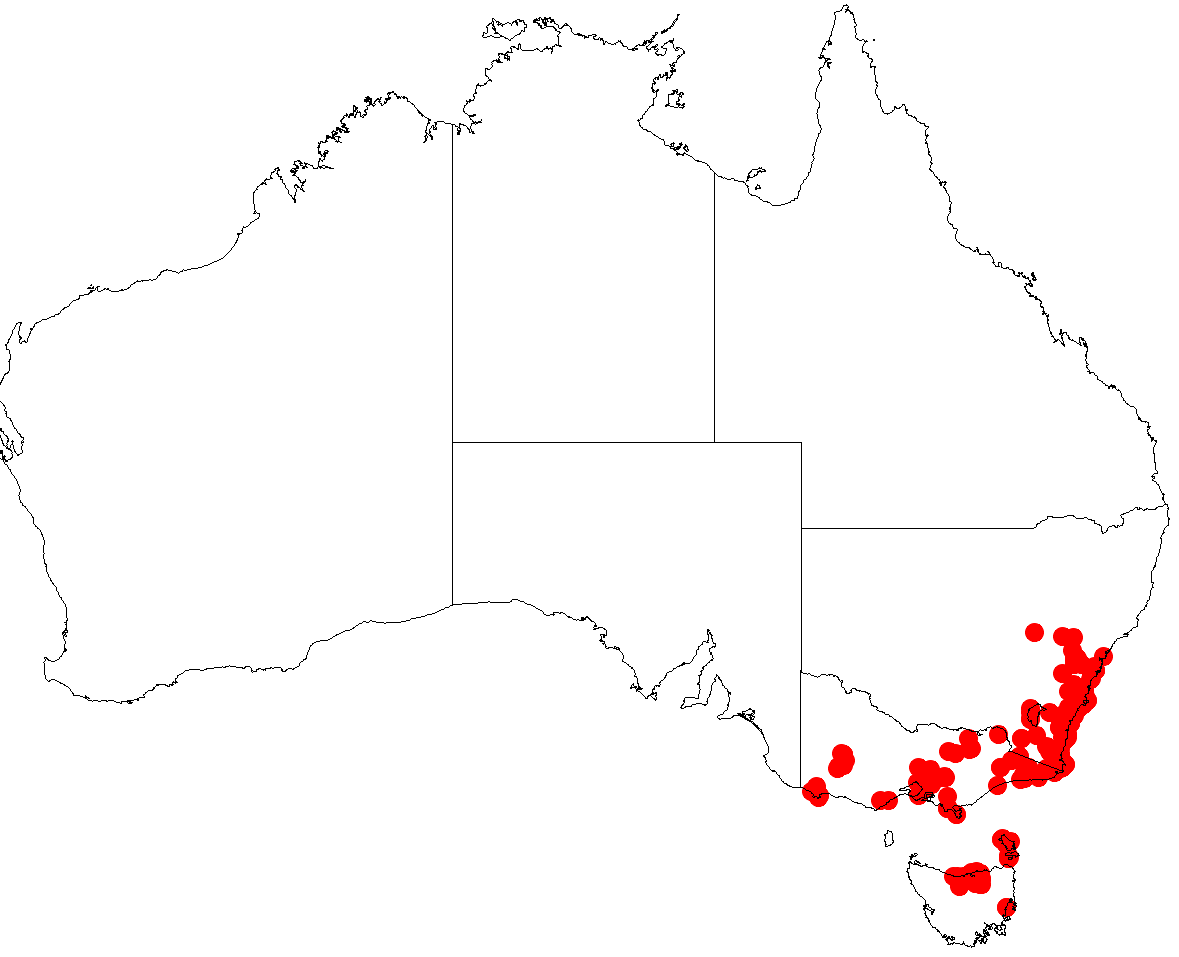
- Occurrence data from Australasian Virtual Herbarium

= Billardiera mutabilis =

Climbing apple berry

Species of plant

Billardiera mutabilis, commonly known as climbing apple berry, apple berry, snot berry, apple dumplings or changeable-flowered billardiera, is a species of flowering plant in the family Pittosporaceae and is endemic to south-eastern Australia. It is a slender climber or twiner with narrowly elliptic leaves and bell-shaped, greenish-yellow flowers that turn bluish as they age.

== Description ==
Billardiera mutabilis is a slender climber or twiner with silky-hairy new stems. Its adult leaves are mostly narrowly elliptic, 18–80 mm (0.71–3.15 in) long and 3–18 mm (0.12–0.71 in) wide on a petiole 2–4 mm (0.079–0.157 in) long. The flowers are usually arranged singly in upper leaf axils or on the ends of branches, on a slender, pendent peduncle 12–45 mm (0.47–1.77 in) long. The sepals are lance-shaped, 4–9 mm (0.16–0.35 in) long. The petals are 12–23 mm (0.47–0.91 in) long, greenish-yellow, tinged with navy blue as they age, and joined at the base to form a bell-shaped tube, the lobes spreading but not curved backwards. Flowering mainly occurs from September to January and the mature fruit is a glabrous green berry 10–20 mm (0.39–0.79 in) long, containing many seeds.

This species is similar to B. scandens, except that B. scandens has hairy fruit.

== Taxonomy ==
Billardiera mutabilis was first formally described in 1806 by Richard Anthony Salisbury in Paradisus Londinensis from a specimen collected by William Paterson. The specific epithet (mutbilis) means "changeable".

== Distribution and habitat ==
Climbing apple berry grows in heathland, woodland and forest on the coast and tablelands of New South Wales and the Australian Capital Territory, south from about Kiama, through southern Victoria to the coasts of Tasmania.
