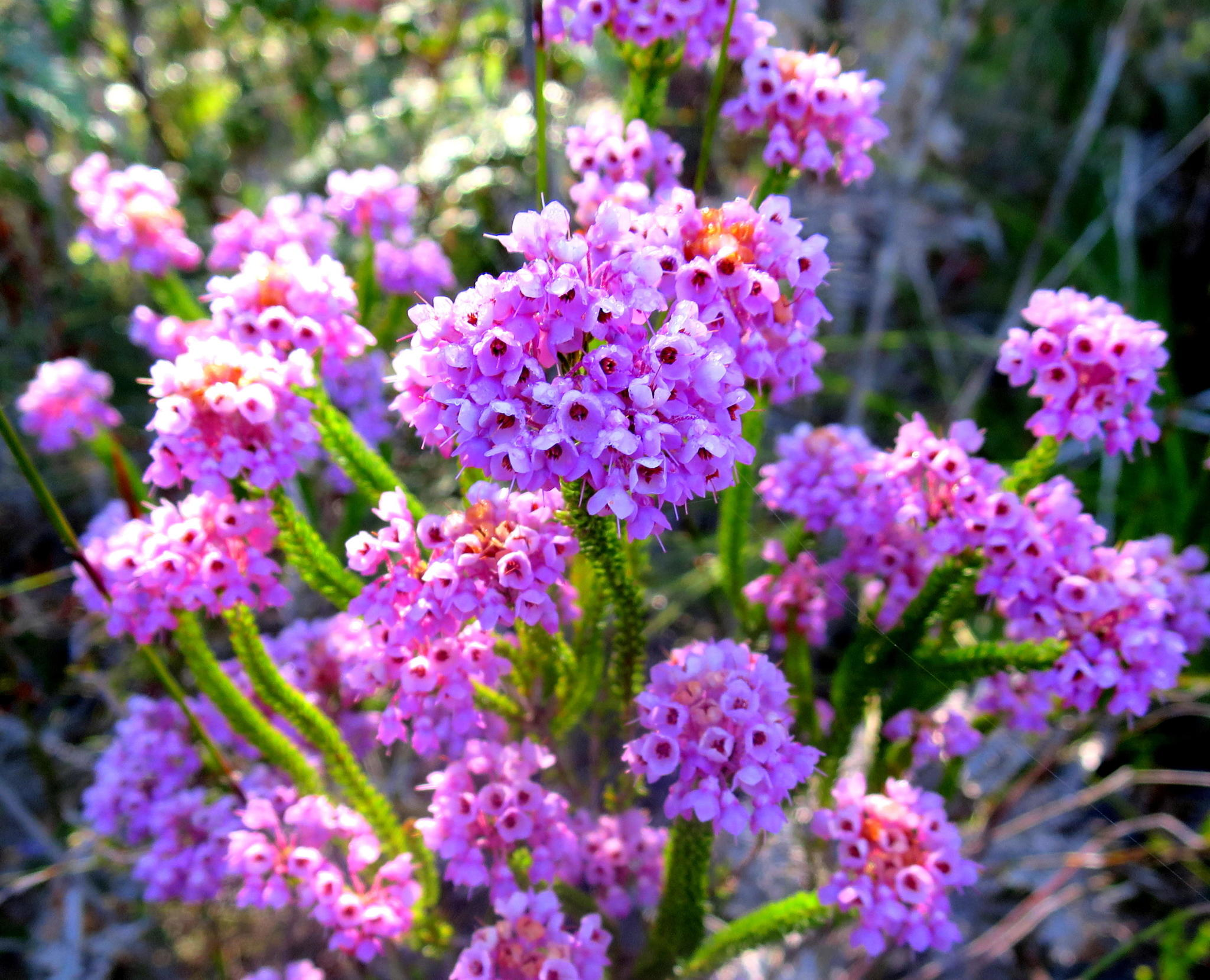

Scientific classification
- Kingdom: Plantae
- Clade: Tracheophytes
- Clade: Angiosperms
- Clade: Eudicots
- Clade: Asterids
- Order: Ericales
- Family: Ericaceae
- Genus: Erica
- Species: E. seriphiifolia

Binomial name
- Erica seriphiifolia Salisb.

Synonyms
- Erica bella Spreng.; Erica cubica Thunb.; Erica incurva Thunb.; Erica inflexa Pers.; Ericoides incurvum Kuntze; Ericoides seriphiifolium (Salisb.) Kuntze; Lophandra seriphiifolia G.Don

= Erica seriphiifolia =

Species of flowering plant

Erica seriphiifolia is a plant belonging to the genus Erica. The species is endemic to the Western Cape.
