= Erica pubigera =

Scientific classification
- Kingdom: Plantae
- Clade: Tracheophytes
- Clade: Angiosperms
- Clade: Eudicots
- Clade: Asterids
- Order: Ericales
- Family: Ericaceae
- Genus: Erica
- Species: E. pubigera

Binomial name
- Erica pubigera Salisb.

Synonyms
- Erica angustata Bartl.; Erica praeusta Bartl.; Ericoides angustatum (Bartl.) Kuntze; Ericoides pubigerum (Salisb.) Kuntze

Species of flowering plant

Erica pubigera is a plant belonging to the genus Erica. The species is endemic to the Western Cape.
