= Erica genistifolia =

Scientific classification
- Kingdom: Plantae
- Clade: Tracheophytes
- Clade: Angiosperms
- Clade: Eudicots
- Clade: Asterids
- Order: Ericales
- Family: Ericaceae
- Genus: Erica
- Species: E. genistifolia

Binomial name
- Erica genistifolia Salisb.

Synonyms
- Erica sessiliflora J.C.Wendl.; Erica tetraloba Roxb. ex Salisb.; Ericoides genistifolium (Salisb.) Kuntze

Species of flowering plant

Erica genistifolia is a plant belonging to the genus Erica and forming part of the fynbos. The species was first described by Richard Anthony Salisbury in 1802. The plant is endemic to the Western Cape.
