= Erica pectinifolia =

Scientific classification
- Kingdom: Plantae
- Clade: Tracheophytes
- Clade: Angiosperms
- Clade: Eudicots
- Clade: Asterids
- Order: Ericales
- Family: Ericaceae
- Genus: Erica
- Species: E. pectinifolia

Binomial name
- Erica pectinifolia Salisb.

Synonyms
- Erica erubescens Andrews; Ericoides pectinifolium (Salisb.) Kuntze; Syringodea erubescens (Andrews) G.Don

Species of flowering plant

Erica pectinifolia is a plant belonging to the genus Erica and is part of the fynbos. The species is endemic to the Western Cape.

The plant also has one variety: Erica pectinifolia var. oblongifolia Dulfer
