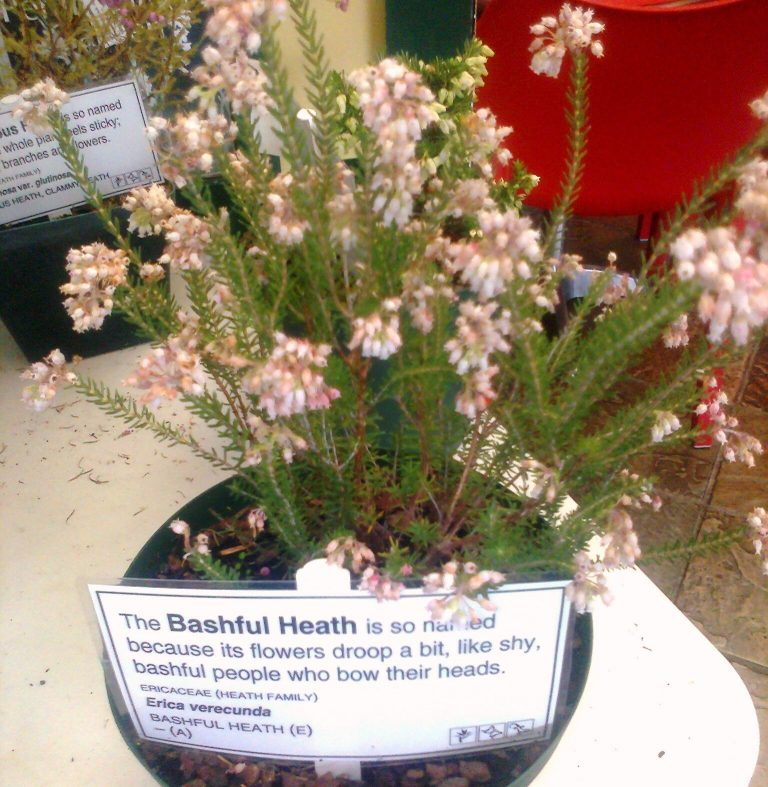

Scientific classification
- Kingdom: Plantae
- Clade: Tracheophytes
- Clade: Angiosperms
- Clade: Eudicots
- Clade: Asterids
- Order: Ericales
- Family: Ericaceae
- Genus: Erica
- Species: E. verecunda

Binomial name
- Erica verecunda Salisb.

Synonyms
- Erica cernua Andrews; Erica ignorata Klotzsch ex Benth.; Ericoides verecundum (Salisb.) Kuntze

= Erica verecunda =

Species of flowering plant

Erica verecunda, the bashful heath, is a plant belonging to the genus Erica and is part of the fynbos. The species is endemic to the Northern Cape and Western Cape.
