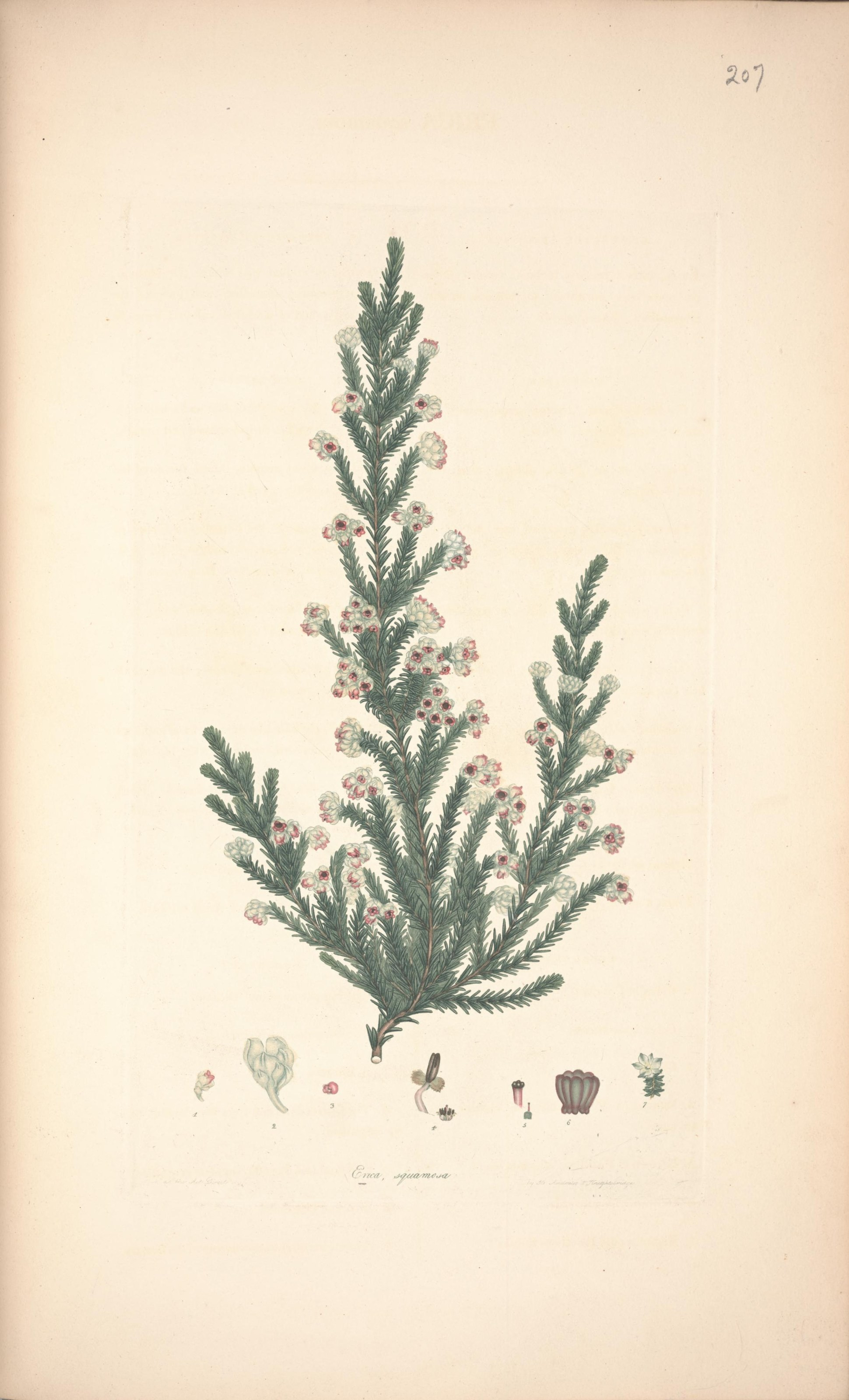

Scientific classification
- Kingdom: Plantae
- Clade: Tracheophytes
- Clade: Angiosperms
- Clade: Eudicots
- Clade: Asterids
- Order: Ericales
- Family: Ericaceae
- Genus: Erica
- Species: E. tegulifolia

Binomial name
- Erica tegulifolia Salisb.

Synonyms
- Erica squamosa Andrews; Eurystegia tegulifolia G.Don; Lamprotis squamosa (Andrews) G.Don

= Erica tegulifolia =

Species of flowering plant

Erica tegulifolia, commonly known in Afrikaans as banketheide, is a plant belonging to the genus Erica. The species is endemic to the Western Cape.
