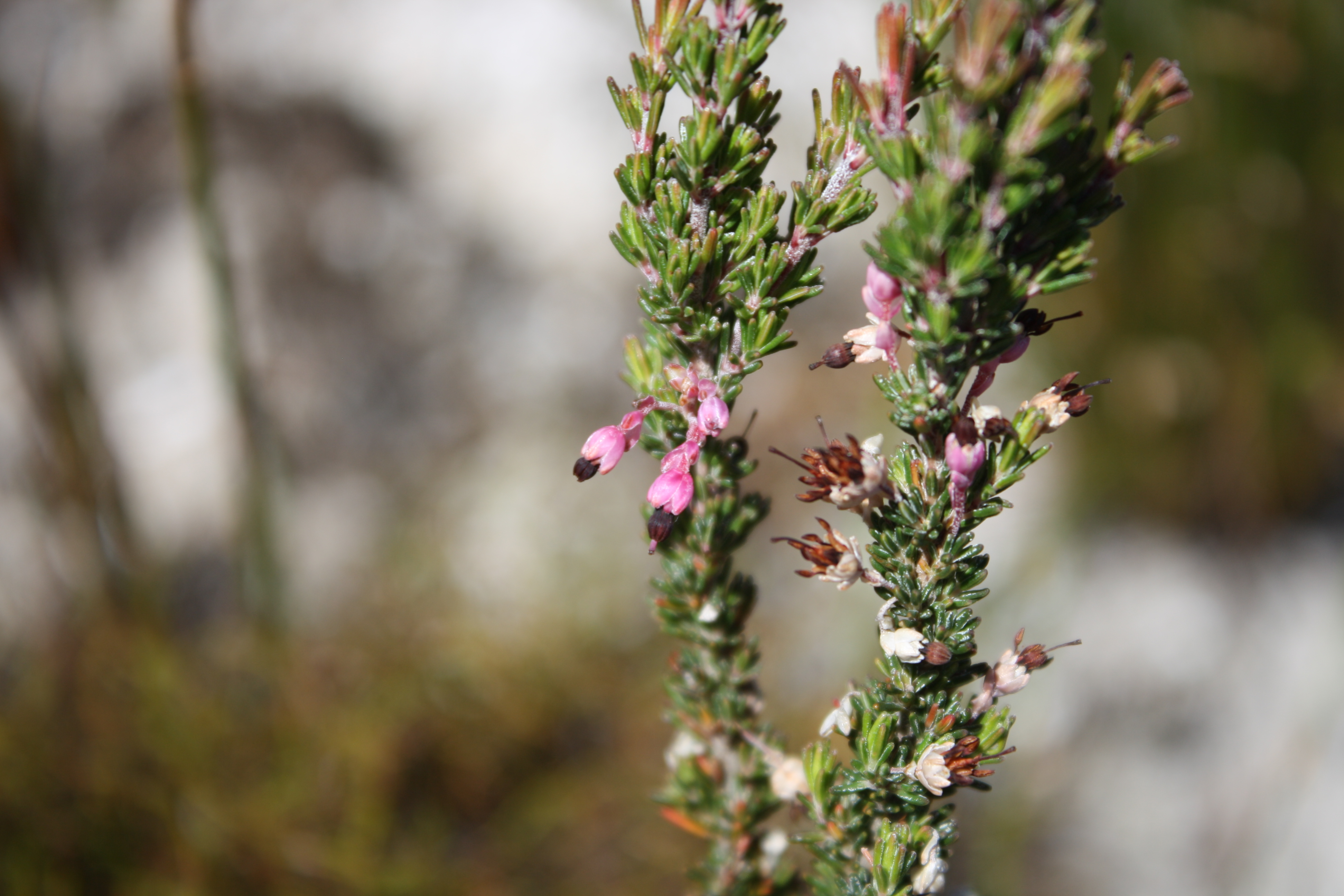

Scientific classification
- Kingdom: Plantae
- Clade: Tracheophytes
- Clade: Angiosperms
- Clade: Eudicots
- Clade: Asterids
- Order: Ericales
- Family: Ericaceae
- Genus: Erica
- Species: E. placentiflora

Binomial name
- Erica placentiflora Salisb.

Synonyms
- Ectasis placentiflora (Salisb.) G.Don; Erica leptophylla Klotzsch ex Benth.; Erica tiariflora Andrews; Ericoides placentiflorum Kuntze; Gypsocallis tiariflora (Andrews) G.Don

= Erica placentiflora =

Species of flowering plant

Erica placentiflora is a plant belonging to the genus Erica and is part of the fynbos. The species is endemic to the Western Cape.
