= The Paradisus Londinensis =

Book of plant illustrations

The Paradisus Londonensis : or Coloured Figures of Plants Cultivated in the Vicinity of the Metropolis
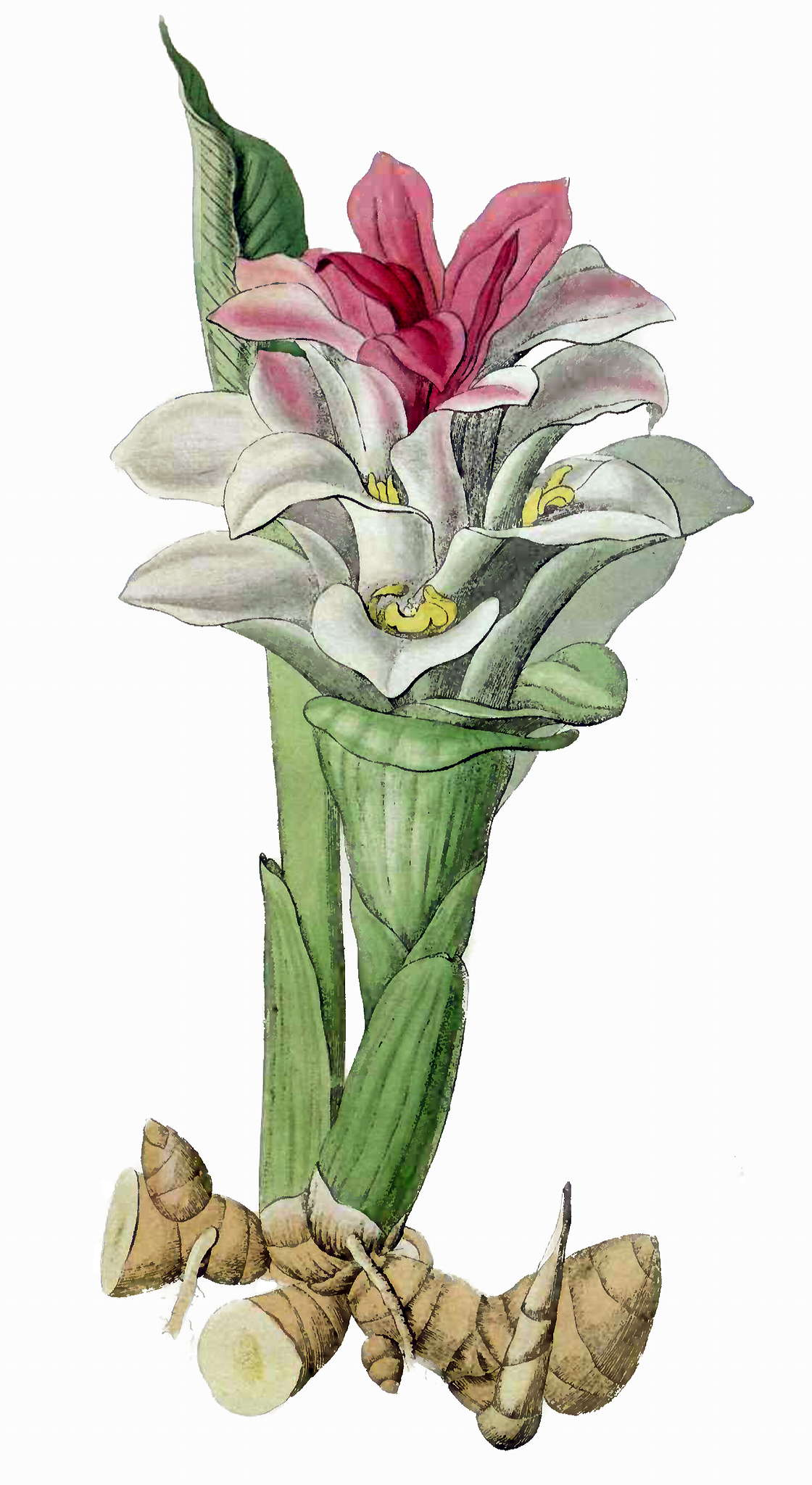
- Part of 96, Curcuma aromatica
- Author: Richard Anthony Salisbury, William Hooker
- Publication date: 1805

The Paradisus Londonensis (full title The Paradisus Londonensis : or Coloured Figures of Plants Cultivated in the Vicinity of the Metropolis) is a book dated 1805–1808, printed by D.N. Shury, and published by William Hooker. It consists of coloured illustrations of 117 plants drawn by William Hooker, with explanatory text by Richard Anthony Salisbury.

== Publication ==
The Paradisus Londinensis was constructed as two volumes, each of two parts. The plates were in one part, the text in the other. The title page of the first volume and part bears the date 1805 and identifies the illustrator and publisher as Hooker. The title page of the second part identifies the author of the text as Salisbury. It has often been catalogued as 1805–1807, although some later plates are dated 1808. The International Plant Names Index dates the parts as follows:

- 1(1): 1 Jun 1805 – 1 May 1806
- 1(2): 1 Jun 1806 – 1 Sep 1808
- 2(1): 1 Jun 1807 – 1 May 1808
- 2(2): 1 Jun 1808 – 1 Sep 1808

== Botanical significance ==
=== New botanical names ===
The Paradisus Londinensis (abbreviated to Parad. Lond. in botanical citations) is a significant source of botanical names, with around 150 attributed to Salisbury on the basis of this publication. Some have been superseded, but others are still in use. The names include:

- Two families, Dilleniaceae and Droseraceae
- 36 genera, including Acis, Calypso, Eustoma and Phyllodoce
- 108 species, including Byblis liniflora, Curcuma aromatica, Goodia lotifolia and Lilium concolor

=== Dispute with Smith ===
The Paradisus Londinensis preserves a record of a dispute between Salisbury and James Edward Smith which had (and still has) consequences for the acceptance of botanical names first published by Salisbury, in this work and others. Smith and Salisbury had become friends while studying at the University of Edinburgh. Later in life, in 1802, they quarrelled. Smith was a strong supporter of Linnaeus's systema sexuale (sexual system) for classifying plants. He had bought Linnaeus's entire collection of books, manuscripts and specimens, and founded the Linnean Society in 1788. Salisbury on the other hand was a supporter of the natural system of classification, in particular that of Antoine Laurent de Jussieu, published in Genera Plantarum in 1789 – the system used in Paradisus Londinensis.

In his 1807 work, An introduction to physiological and systematical botany, Smith had used newly discovered plants from the west coast of British Columbia, Canada (plants which he did not name) to support the view that the tepals of lilioid monocots were actually sepals, since their flowers had what Smith regarded as six internal petals. In The Paradisus Londinensis, in the notes to number 98, dated 1 March 1808, Salisbury named these plants as the genus Hookera with two species H. coronaria and H. pulchella. (The latter is illustrated as number 117.) Salisbury pointed out that the supposed internal petals were actually stamens (three sterile ones and the bases of three normal ones). He also disputed Smith's association of the plant with Agapanthus, placing it instead with Allium. He says "I regret much to dissent so often from the celebrated lecturer [Smith]".

Shortly afterwards in 1808, Smith named a moss genus Hookeria and read to the Linnean Society a formal description of a new genus, based on the same species as Salisbury's Hookera coronaria, naming the genus Brodiaea in honour of Scottish botanist James Brodie. (The presentation was not published until 1810.) George Boulger, writing in the Dictionary of National Biography, says that Smith's actions were deliberately intended to deprive Salisbury of credit for the genus Hookera. In the text for figure 117, dated 1 September 1808, Salisbury says that "Smith, to suit his own purpose, was utterly silent" on the prior naming of the genus by Salisbury, and that Smith's "multiplied acts of injustice to me whether open or concealed, I sincerely forgive."

If it was Smith's deliberate intention to suppress Salisbury's botanical names by giving a moss a confusingly similar name and by renaming Hookera to Brodiaea, he was, initially at least, successful. James Britten, writing much later in 1886, argued that the then established name Brodiaea should be replaced by Hookera, which had priority. (He also showed how many of Salisbury's other names had been ignored.) However, Smith's Hookeria and Brodiaea had become so widely used that they were made conserved names, and Hookera was not reinstated. Salisbury's epithet coronaria in his Hookera coronaria is still used in the combination Brodiaea coronaria. As of September 2013, Hookera pulchella is considered as a synonym, either in full or in part, for Dichelostemma congestum, and the epithet pulchella is not used, although Britten had argued for its priority.

== Contents ==
The 117 plants illustrated in The Paradisus Londinensis are listed below. Salisbury's original orthography is given in brackets where different from modern usage. Accepted names as of September 2013 are taken from The Plant List, unless otherwise referenced. An asterisk indicates that no accepted name has been found.

- Trillium grandiflorum (Michx.) Salisb.
- Protea acuifolia *
- Bryophyllum calycinum = Bryophyllum pinnatum (Lam.) Oken
- Vaccinium buxifolium *
- Magnolia annonifolia [Magnolia annonaefolia] = Magnolia figo (Lour.) DC. var. figo
- Gompholobium psoraleifolium [Gompholobium psoraleaefolium] *
- Podalyria argentea Salisb. = Podalyria racemulosa DC.
- Gladiolus concolor = Gladiolus tristis L.
- Aphyllanthes juncea = Aphyllanthes monspeliensis L.
- Moraea odora [Morea odora] = Moraea fugax (D.Delaroche) Jacq. subsp. fugax
- Protea glaucophylla = Protea acaulos Reich.
- Crossandra undulifolia [Crossandra undulaefolia] = Crossandra infundibuliformis (L.) Nees
- Coronilla viminalis Salisb.
- Castalia magnifica = Nymphaea magnifica *
- Eucalyptus obliqua L'Hér.
- Dahlia sambucifolia = Dahlia pinnata Cav.
- Dioscorea tamifolia = Dioscorea bulbifera L.
- Reaumuria linifolia *
- Dahlia bidentifolia = Dahlia coccinea Cav.
- Convolvulus pannifolius *
- Leucojum autumnale = Acis autumnalis (L.) Sweet
- Hibiscus grandiflorus *
- Pelargonium nummulifolium *
- Protea mucronifolia *
- Cacalia bicolor = Gynura bicolor (Roxb. ex Willd.) DC.
- Campanula alliariifolia Willd. [Campanula alliariaefolia]
- Protea lacticolor *
- Swainsona coronillifolia [Swainsona coronillaefolia] = Swainsona galegifolia (Andrews) R.Br.
- Columnea rotundifolia = Columnea scandens L.
- Crocus serotinus Salisb.
- Yucca recurvifolia = Yucca gloriosa var. tristis Carrière
- Sabatia gracilis [Sabbatia gracilis] = Sabatia campanulata var. gracilis *
- Hibiscus acerifolius = Hibiscus syriacus L.
- Eustoma silenifolium = Eustoma exaltatum (L.) Salisb.
- Trillium foetidum = Trillium erectum L. var. erectum
- Phyllodoce taxifolia = Phyllodoce caerulea (L.) Bab.
- Protea longifolia *
- Magnolia conspicua = Magnolia denudata Desr.
- Pelargonium pulchellum *
- Bromelia aquilega = Aechmea aquilega (Salisb.) Griseb.
- Goodia lotifolia Salisb.
- Woodfordia floribunda = Woodfordia fruticosa (L.) Kurz
- Magnolia auricularis = Magnolia fraseri Walter
- Menziesia globularis *
- Convolvulus farinosus L.
- Gardenia crassicaulis = Gardenia thunbergia Thunb.
- Lilium concolor Salisb.
- Billardiera mutabilis Salisb.
- Cymburus mutabilis = Stachytarpheta mutabilis (Jacq.) Vahl
- Justicia virgularis = Anisacanthus quadrifidus (Vahl) Nees
- Clitoria calcarigera *
- Crinum yucciflorum [Crinum yuccaeflorum] = Crinum zeylanicum (L.) L.
- Cymburus urticifolius [Cymburus urticaefolius] = Stachytarpheta urticifolia (Salisb.) Sims
- Ornithoglossum glaucum = Ornithoglossum viride (L.f.) Dryand. ex W.T.Aiton
- Hamelia grandiflora = Hamelia ventricosa Sw.
- Lacathea florida *
- Dianthus pomeridianus L. *
- Chamaenerion halimifolium [Chamaenerium halmifolium] = Epilobium latifolium L.
- Tradescantia crassifolia Cav.
- Astrantia helleborifolia = Astrantia maxima Pall
- Bignonia grandiflora = Campsis grandiflora (Thunb.) K.Schum.
- Dianthus collinus Waldst. & Kit.
- Carpolyza spiralis = Strumaria spiralis (L'Hér.) W.T.Aiton
- Anneslia falcifolia = Calliandra houstoniana Standl. var. anomala (Kunth) Barneby (The drawing has A. grandiflora, corrected to A. falcifolia in the text.)
- Rothmannia longiflora Salisb.
- Oxalis glandulitega *
- Erodendrum amplexicaule = Protea amplexicaulis *
- Castalia pygmaea = Nymphaea tetragona Georgi
- Southwellia nobilis *
- Erodendrum tenax *
- Claytonia spathulifolia [Claytonia spatulaefolia] = Claytonia caroliniana Michx. var. lewisii McNeill
- Begonia nitida = Begonia minor Jacq.
- Hibbertia grossulariifolia [Hibbertia grossulariaefolia] * (The drawing has Burtonia, corrected to Hibbertia in the text.)
- Leucojum pulchellum [Leucoium pulchellum] = Leucojum aestivum L. subsp. pulchellum (Salisb.) Briq.
- Euryspermum salicifolium *
- Erodendrum formosum = Protea formosa *
- Stylidium glandulosum Salisb.
- Paeonia edulis = Paeonia lactiflora Pall.
- Linum hypericifolium Salisb.
- Rhododendron officinale = Rhododendron aureum Georgi
- Ipomoea repanda = Quamoclit repanda (Jacq.) Roberty
- Myrobroma fragrans = Vanilla planifolia Jacks. ex Andrews
- Corybas aconitiflorus Salisb.
- Pancratium nervifolium = Proiphys amboinensis (L.) Herb.
- Prenanthes suavis *
- Pancratium tiariflorum [Pancratium tiaraeflorum] = Pancratium zeylanicum L.
- Magnolia gracilis = Magnolia liliiflora Desr.
- Bouvardia triphylla = Bouvardia ternifolia (Cav.) Schltdl.
- Calypso borealis = Calypso bulbosa (L.) Oakes
- Mesembryanthemum acinaciforme *
- Jatropha multifida L.
- Smithia sensitiva Aiton
- Euclinia longiflora Salisb. [Randia longiflora]
- Hibiscus tiliifolius [Hibiscus tiliaefolius] = Hibiscus tiliaceus L.
- Byblis liniflora Salisb.
- Curcuma aromatica Salisb.
- Anigozanthos grandiflorus [Anigozanthus grandiflora] = Anigozanthos flavidus DC
- Hookera coronaria = Brodiaea coronaria (Salisb.) Jeps.
- Cephaëlis peduncularis = Psychotria peduncularis (Salisb.) Steyerm.
- Correa cotinifolia = Correa alba Andrews
- Rosa simplicifolia = Rosa persica Michx. ex J. F. Gmel.
- Abroma fastuosa [Abroma fastuosum] = Abroma augusta (L.) L.f.
- Chlamysporum juncifolium = Thysanotus juncifolius (Salisb.) J.H.Willis & Court
- Diapensia obtusifolia = Diapensia lapponica L.
- Euryspermum grandiflorum = Leucadendron grandiflorum *
- Crocus lageniflorus [Crocus lagenaeflorus] = Crocus flavus Weston subsp. flavus
- Primula sedifolia = Vitaliana primuliflora Bertol.
- Erodendrum turbiniflorum *
- Lachnaea glauca = Lachnaea pomposa Beyers
- Orchis bracteata [Orchis bractealis] = Dactylorhiza viridis (L.) R.M.Bateman, Pridgeon & M.W.Chase var. virescens (Muhl. ex Willd.) ined.
- Embothrium speciosum *
- Dianthus fragrans M.Bieb.
- Salvia bicolor *
- Podalyria oleifolia Salisb. [Podalyria oleaefolia]
- Adina globiflora = Adina pilulifera (Lam.) Franch. ex Drake
- Leucadendron grandiflorum [Leucadendrum grandiflorum] *
- Hookera pulchella = Dichelostemma congestum (Sm.) Kunth

== Bibliography ==
- Salisbury, R.A. & Hooker, W. (1805–1808), The Paradisus Londonensis : or Coloured Figures of Plants Cultivated in the Vicinity of the Metropolis, London: W. Hooker (printer D.N. Shury), doi:10.5962/bhl.title.53520, OCLC 1864969 (The scan is as a single volume with plates and text interspersed.)
