= Hooky =

Hooky, Hookey or Hookie may refer to:

- To "play hooky", a slang term, particularly in North America, for committing truancy
- Hooky (webcomic), a webtoon by Spanish author Míriam Bonastre Tur
- Hooky (nickname), a list of people and fictional characters
- Hookey (surname), a list of people
- "Hooky", a season 1 episode of the animated television show SpongeBob SquarePants
