= Hookey (surname) =

Hookey is a surname. Notable people with the surname include:

- Gordon Hookey (born 1961), Australian aboriginal artist
- Lee Hookey (born 1979), Australian rugby league player
- Scott Hookey (born 1967), Australian cricketer

== See also ==
- Hooker (surname)
