= Hooky (nickname) =

As a nickname, Hooky (or spelling variations thereof) may refer to:

- F. S. Bell (1897–1973), British Royal Navy captain nicknamed "Hookie", commanded HMS Exeter in the Second World War Battle of the River Plate
- Edgar Chadwick (1869–1942), English footballer and national coach of the Netherlands
- Hooks Dauss (1889–1963), American Major League Baseball pitcher
- Denys Hill (1896–1971), English cricketer
- Peter Hook (born 1956), British musician and singer
- Hookey Leonard (1901–1982), Scottish footballer
- John McPhail (footballer) (1923–2000), Scottish footballer
- Hook-handed man, a fictional character in A Series of Unfortunate Events by Lemony Snicket, called "Hooky" by other characters

== See also ==
- Hooky (disambiguation)
