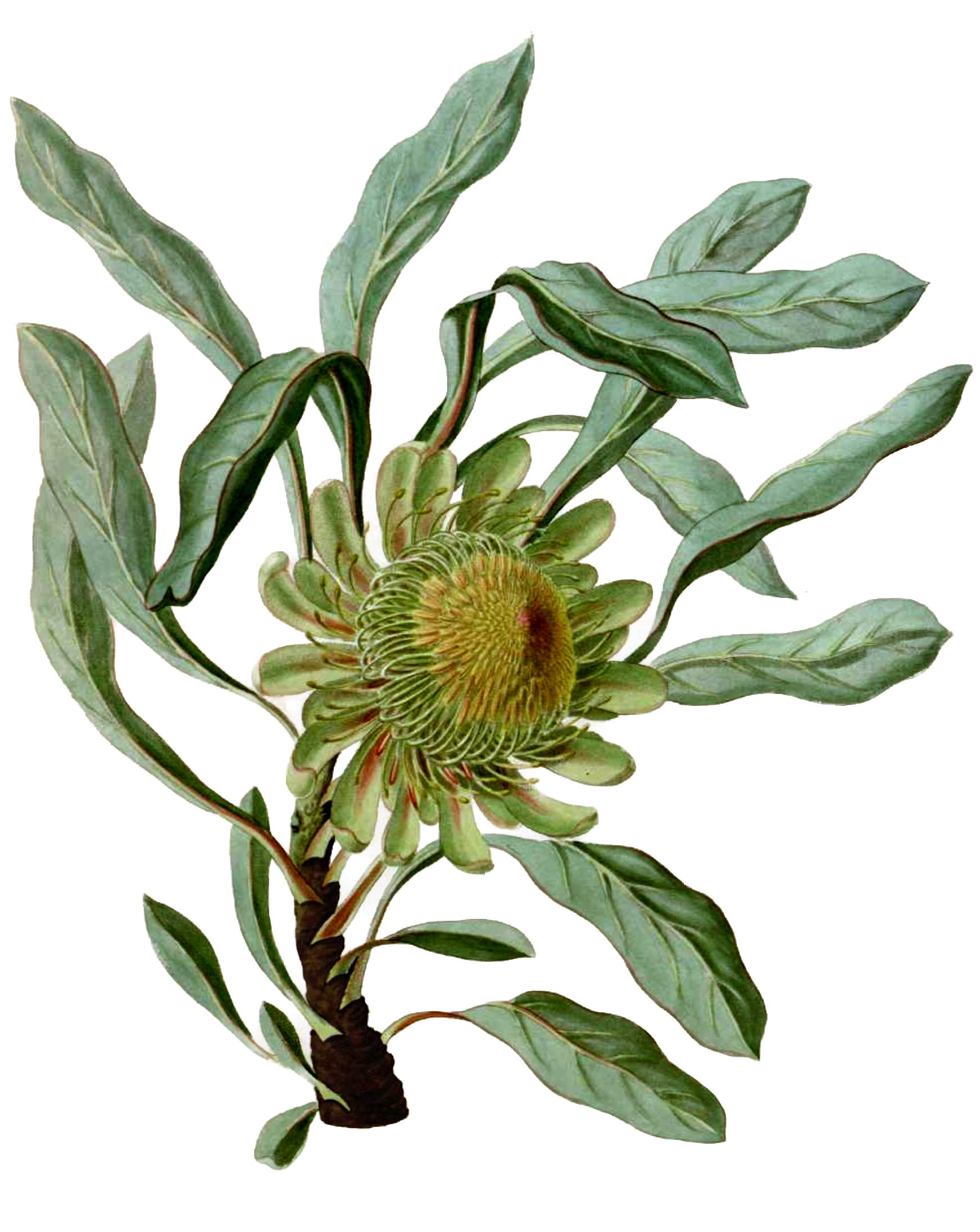
- Illustration from The Paradisus Londinensis, 1805

Conservation status
- Near Threatened (IUCN 3.1)

Scientific classification
- Kingdom: Plantae
- Clade: Tracheophytes
- Clade: Angiosperms
- Clade: Eudicots
- Order: Proteales
- Family: Proteaceae
- Genus: Protea
- Species: P. acaulos

Binomial name
- Protea acaulos (L.) Reichard

Synonyms
- Leucadendron acaulon L.; Protea acaulis Thunb.; Protea glaucophylla J.Lee & J.Kenn. ex Salisb., nom. illeg.; Erodendrum glaucophyllum Salisb. ex. Knight; Erodendrum limoniifolium Salisb. ex. Knight; Protea elongata R.Br.; Protea angustata Drège ex. Meisn.

= Protea acaulos =

Species of flowering plant

Protea acaulos, also known as the common ground sugarbush, is a flowering plant found in the southwestern Cape Region, South Africa. It is also simply known as ground protea; in the Afrikaans language it is known as an aardroos.

== Taxonomy ==
This species was first described as Leucadendron acaulon by Linnaeus in the Species Plantarum of 1753. Johann Jacob Reichard moved it to the genus Protea in the 1879 part of the book Systema Plantarum, misspelling the specific epithet as "acaulis"; this spelling was used up until 1912 and the name thus attributed to Carl Peter Thunberg, but the spelling has subsequently been moved to "acaulos", the Greek feminine. The spelling "acaule" has also been used.

Protea glaucophylla was described by Richard Anthony Salisbury in The Paradisus Londinensis in 1805. Although he soon, in 1809, moved it to Erodendrum glaucophyllum in a work published under the authorship of the gardener Joseph Knight titled On the cultivation of the plants belonging to the natural order of Proteeae, this was generally ignored, and up until at least 1912 it was thought that Protea glaucophylla and P. acaulis were two similar, but separate, species, with P. glaucophylla having a more limited distribution around Tulbagh and Riversdale.

== Description ==
It grows as a dwarf or creeping shrub with a maximum height of around 30 cm (12 in), although it may also only grow to 7 cm (2.8 in) tall, and 1 m (3 ft 3 in) across. The branches are underground, and the plant grows as densely packed tufts of leaves poking out of the ground. It has a thick rootstock, and will re-sprout from this or other underground parts after the above-ground parts of the plant are destroyed in wildfires. It is a very long-lived species, three generations of plants are thought to last from 150 to 300 years.

The plant is monoecious with both sexes in each flower. The plant blooms in Spring, from June to November.

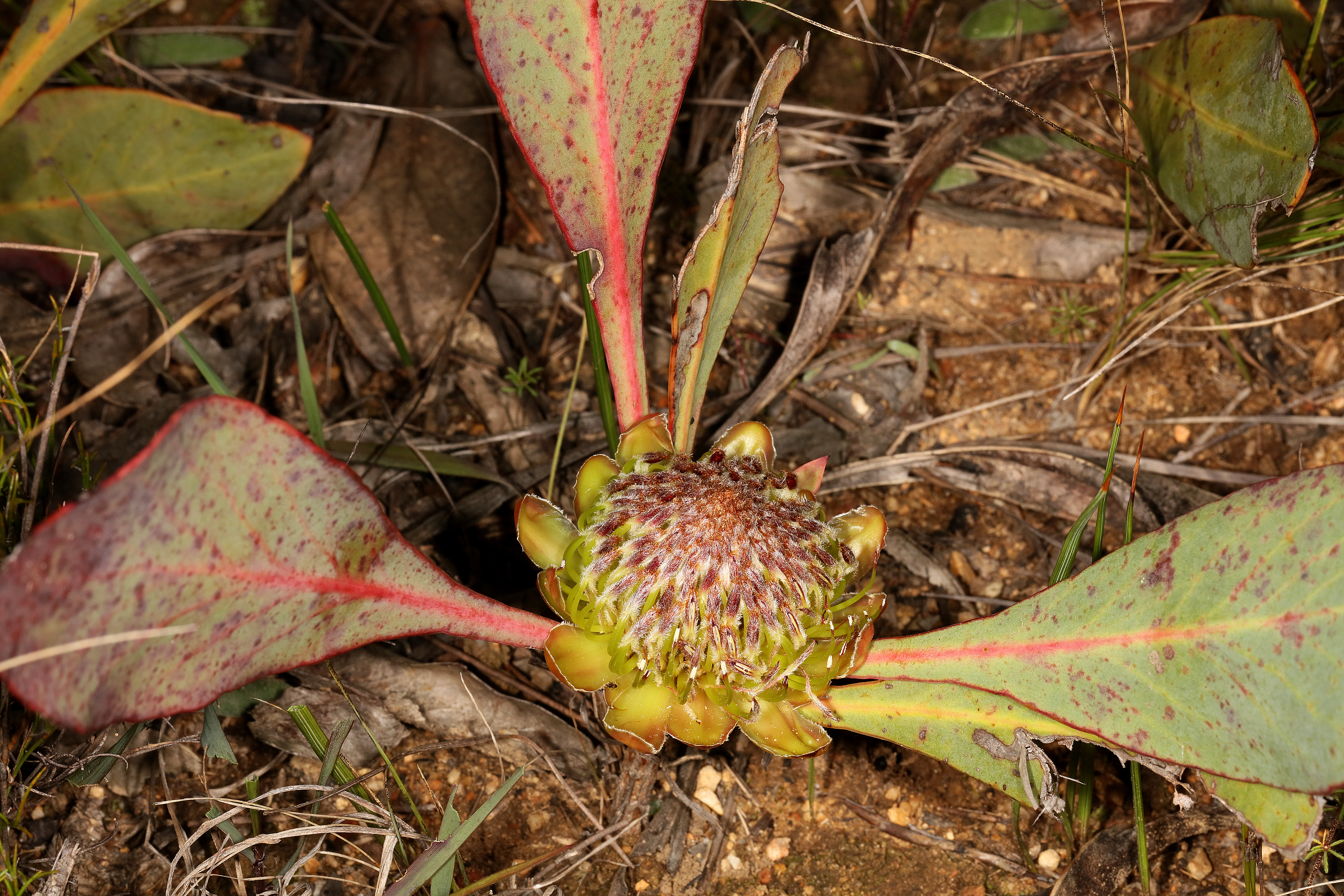
Protea acaulos flowering at ground level, at Jonkershoek Nature Reserve, Stellenbosch, Western Cape, South Africa

== Distribution ==
Protea acaulos is an endemic species of the Western Cape province of South Africa, but it is nonetheless widespread in this province. It is found on the Cape Peninsula in the southwest, and furthermore grows on the flats north to the Cederberg in the northwest, to the Elim Flats in the Agulhas Plain, the Caledon Swartberg, and the Riviersonderend Mountains, eastwards to Bredasdorp.

There is a small, isolated, disjunct population on the Langeberg Mountains near Barrydale.

It occurs in low densities and solitary plants are often encountered.

== Ecology ==
It is a member of the "acid sand fynbos complex" of plants, adapted to the regular occurrence of fires. It grows from sea level to altitudes of 1,500 m (4,900 ft), or 1,800 m (5,900 ft). Although it prefers sandy and alluvial soils on flats or on the lower slopes of lowland or mountain fynbos, it may also be encountered in shale and granite fynbos.

The flowers are pollinated by rats, mice and birds. The seeds are stored in the dried, fire-resistant inflorescence (seedheads) which remains attached to the plant, and are only released after fires 1 to 2 years after flowering, with dispersal taking place through action of the wind.

== Conservation ==
The species was not thought to be threatened in 1998, and it was assessed as 'least concern' by the South African National Biodiversity Institute (SANBI) in 2009, but it was reassessed as 'near threatened' by SANBI as of 2019. It is a widespread species, but the total population is thought to have been significantly reduced across the Cape Lowlands, this being due to ongoing habitat loss and degradation, so much so, that the assessors assert that the species may soon cross the threshold for being accepted as 'vulnerable', based on projected population reduction over the past three generations of the shrub.

About 26% of this species' habitat is irreversibly modified, and habitat loss continues. Most of this loss is due to urban expansion and agricultural development. Much of its habitat has also been destroyed on the lower slopes of mountains to plant forests for use as timber. The population is thus thought to be decreasing as of 2019. SANBI infers a population reduction of 23–28% based on the projected habitat loss over the past three generations. Nonetheless, most of its remaining habitat is in mountainous areas where the land is being developed at a significantly lower rate than in the lowlands, thus it is considered very difficult to give an estimation of how fast the population may reduce in the future.

In the fragmented areas in the lowlands where it does occur, its population is mostly being reduced due to wildfire suppression, which hampers its system of reproduction and thus the recruitment of young new plants. In these lowland areas it furthermore faces threats from overgrazing and invasive grasses.

Areas in which it is being outcompeted by dense infestations of invasive plants are on the southern slopes of the Riviersonderend Mountains, the Agulhas Plain in the Cape Floristic Region, the Swartberg near the town of Caledon, and in the sand fynbos between Malmesbury and Mamre.

A population is protected within the Grootbos Nature Reserve, a private nature reserve located on the edge of the Agulhas Plain.
