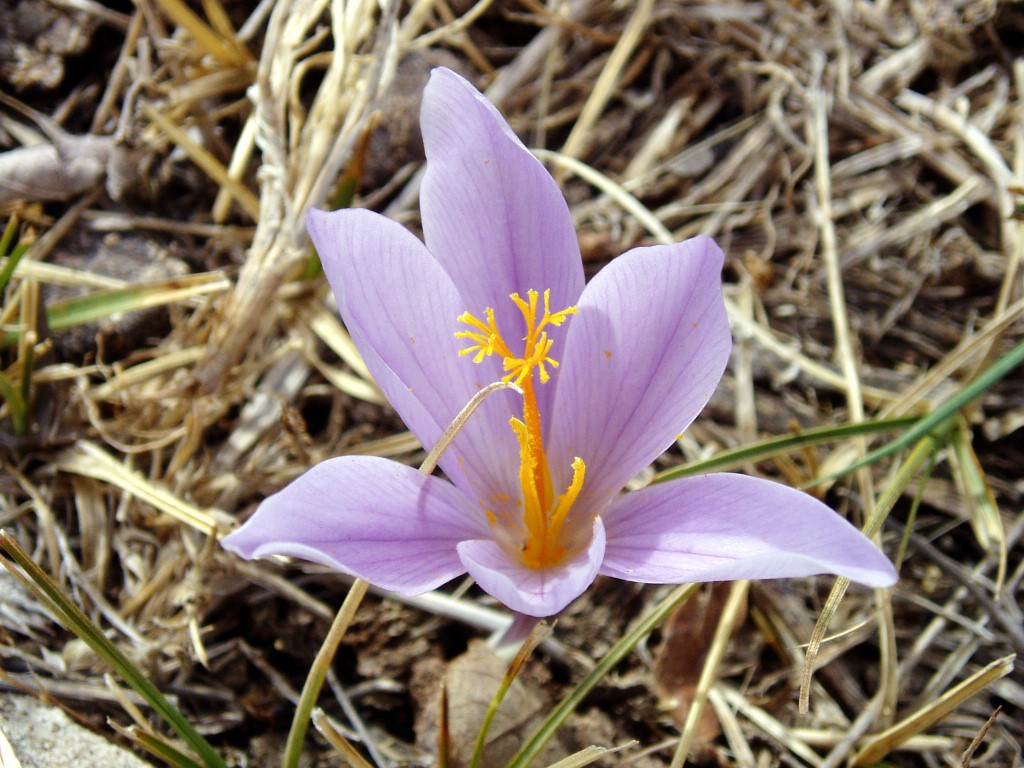

Scientific classification
- Kingdom: Plantae
- Clade: Tracheophytes
- Clade: Angiosperms
- Clade: Monocots
- Order: Asparagales
- Family: Iridaceae
- Genus: Crocus
- Species: C. serotinus

Binomial name
- Crocus serotinus Salisb.

= Crocus serotinus =

Species of flowering plant

Crocus serotinus, the late crocus, is a species of flowering plant in the genus Crocus of the family Iridaceae, found in the Iberian peninsula and North Africa.
