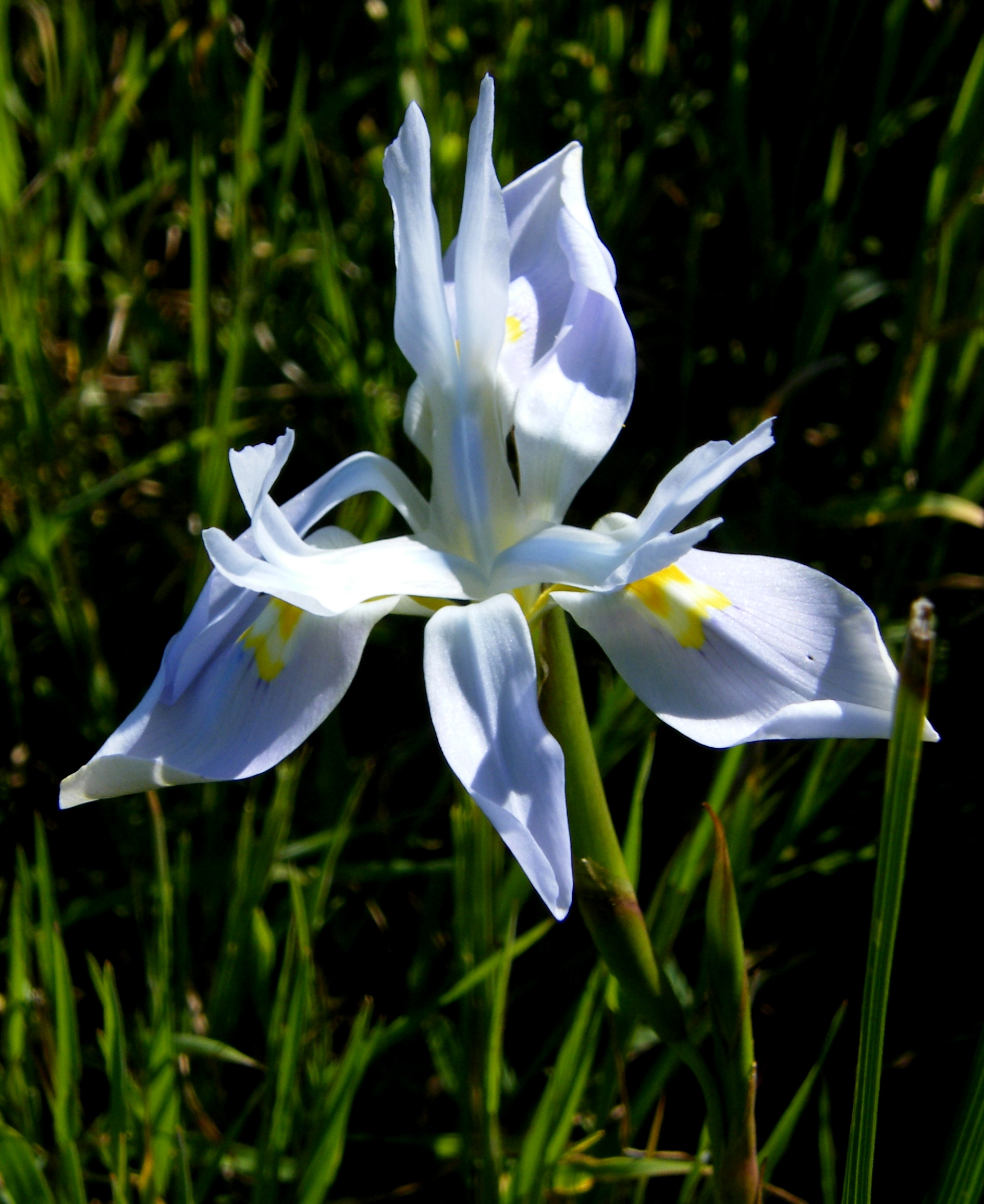

Scientific classification
- Kingdom: Plantae
- Clade: Tracheophytes
- Clade: Angiosperms
- Clade: Monocots
- Order: Asparagales
- Family: Iridaceae
- Genus: Moraea
- Species: M. fugax

Binomial name
- Moraea fugax (D.Delaroche) Jacq.

Synonyms
- Aristea umbellata Spreng.; Iris capensis Burm.f.; Iris edulis L.f.; Iris longifolia Schneev.; Moraea capensis (Burm.f.) Klatt; Moraea corniculata Lam.; Moraea edulis (L.f.) Ker Gawl.; Moraea edulis var. longifolia (Schneev.) Baker; Moraea edulis var. odora (Salisb.) Baker; Moraea longifolia (Schneev.) Sweet; Moraea odora Salisb.; Vieusseuxia edulis (L.f.) Link; Vieusseuxia fugax D.Delaroche; Vieusseuxia longifolia Eckl.

= Moraea fugax =

Species of flowering plant

Moraea fugax, commonly known as the soetuintjie, klipuintjie, or sweet tulip, is a plant and geophyte belonging to the genus Moraea and is part of the fynbos. The species is endemic to the Northern Cape and Western Cape and occurs from Namaqualand, southwards to the Cape Peninsula and eastwards to Swellendam. The plant flowers from August to November and grows 12-80 cm tall with branched stems. The flowers can be white, blue or yellow, are pungent in scent and are borne on a compact inflorescence. Usually only one flower opens at a time.
