= James Hooker =

James Hooker may refer to:

- James Hooker (New York politician), American lawyer and politician from New York.
- James Benjamin Hooker, farmer and political figure in Saskatchewan
- James Hooker (musician), American musician
- J. Murray Hooker, lawyer and U.S. Representative from Virginia
