= George Hooker (cricketer) =

English cricketer

Personal information
- Full name: George Spencer Hooker
- Born: 30 May 1836; East Grinstead, Sussex, England
- Died: 1877 (aged 40–41); Tunbridge Wells, Kent, England
- Batting: Unknown
- Bowling: Unknown

Domestic team information
- Years: Team
- 1857–1859: Sussex

Career statistics
Competition	First-class
Matches	4
Runs scored	35
Batting average	11.66
100s/50s	–/–
Top score	17
Balls bowled	345
Wickets	15
Bowling average	9.66
5 wickets in innings	2
10 wickets in match	1
Best bowling	5/32
Catches/stumpings	1/–
- Source: Cricinfo, 7 January 2012

George Spencer Hooker (30 May 1836 – 1877) was an English cricketer. Hooker's batting and bowling styles are unknown. He was born at East Grinstead, Sussex.

Hodson made his first-class debut for Sussex against the Marylebone Cricket Club in 1857. He made three further first-class appearances for the county, the last of which came against Kent in 1859. In his four first-class matches for Sussex, he took 15 wickets at an average of 9.66, with best figures of 5/32. These figures came on debut against the Marylebone Cricket Club, in which he took 10 of his 15 career wickets. He 5/32 in the Marylebone Cricket Club's first-innings, while in their second-innings he took 5/33, finishing with match figures of 10/65. With the bat, he scored a total of 35 runs at a batting average of 11.66, with a high score of 17.

He died at Tunbridge Wells, Kent at some point in 1877.
