= William Hooker (botanical illustrator) =

British illustrator (1779–1832)

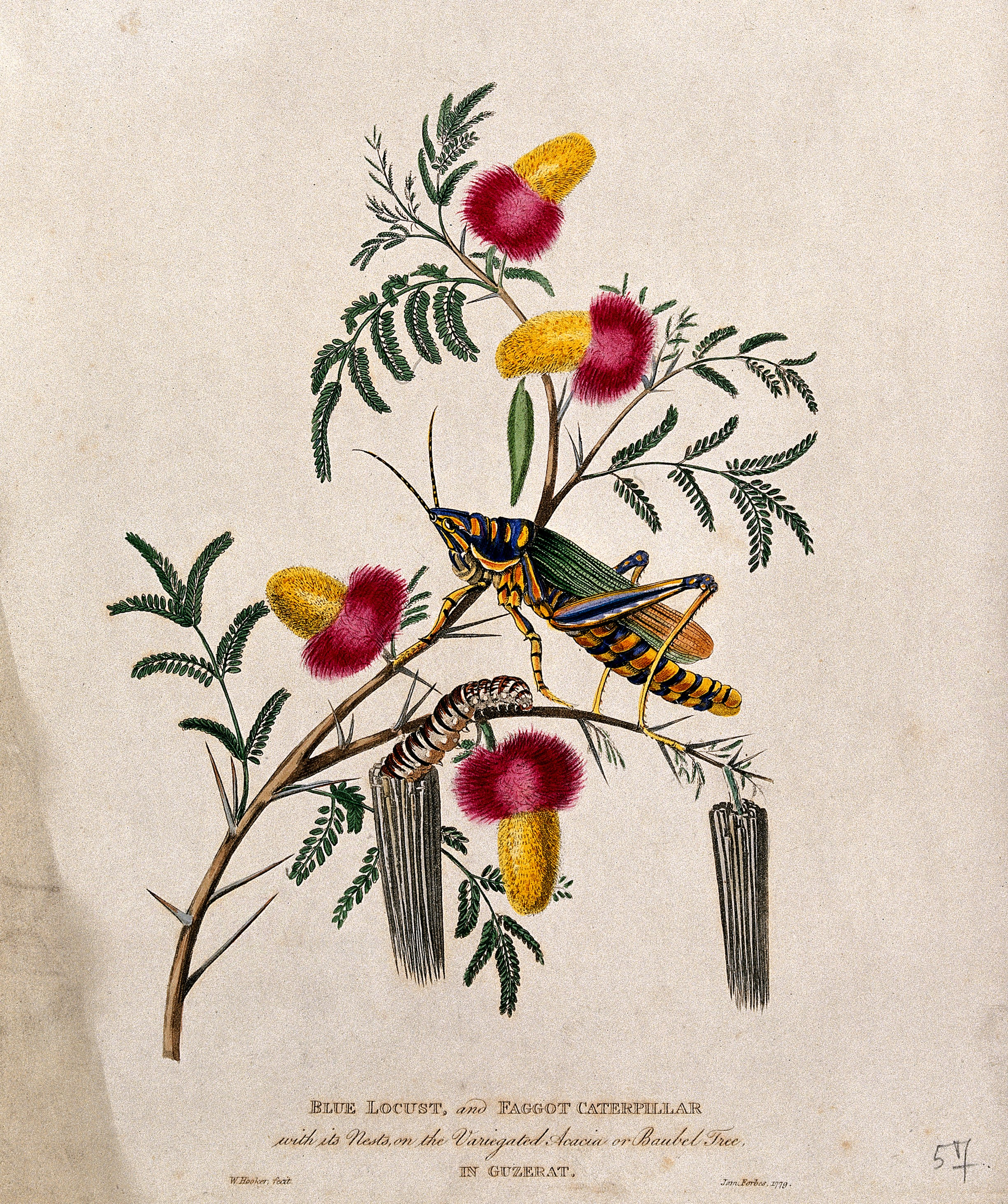
Aquatint by Hooker, showing a blue locust on a wattle branch

William Hooker (1779–1832) was a British illustrator of natural history. He studied under Franz Bauer (1758–1840), becoming the official artist of the Royal Horticultural Society from 1812 until retirement in 1820, whose publications he illustrated. His paintings of fruit were particularly appreciated.

Hooker is best known for his invention of Hooker's green, a dark green color he invented by mixing Prussian blue and gamboge. Hooker invented the shade to aid in illustrating leaves.

Hooker also worked on the Oriental Memoirs of James Forbes and The Paradisus Londinensis, with descriptions by Richard Anthony Salisbury (1761–1829). He contributed illustrations for Hooker's Finest Fruits until his death in 1832.

The standard author abbreviation W.Hook. is used to indicate this person as the author when citing a botanical name.

== See also ==
- Hooker's green, a green pigment, useful for representing leaves.
