= Richard Anthony Salisbury =

British botanist and gardener (1761–1829)

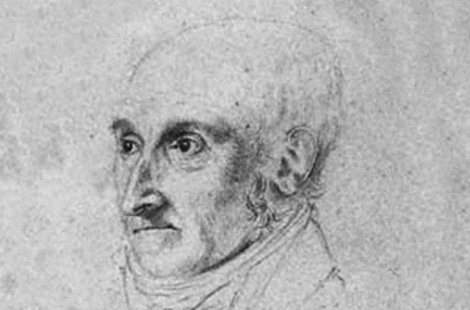
- Salisbury portrayed by William John Burchell
- Born: Richard Anthony Markham; 2 May 1761; Leeds, England
- Died: 23 March 1829 (aged 67); London, England
- Education: University of Edinburgh
- Scientific career
- Fields: Botany
- Author abbrev. (botany): Salisb.

Richard Anthony Salisbury FRS (born Richard Anthony Markham; 2 May 1761 – 23 March 1829) was a British botanist. While he carried out valuable work in horticultural and botanical sciences, several bitter disputes caused him to be ostracised by his contemporaries.

== Life ==
Richard Anthony Markham was born in Leeds, England, as the only son of Richard Markham, a cloth merchant and Elizabeth Laycock. His family included two sisters, including his older sister Mary (b. 1755). One of his sisters became a nun. His mother, was the great grand-daughter of Jonathan Laycock of Shaw Hill. Laycock in turn married Mary Lyte (b. 1537), brother of Henry Lyte, the botanist and translator of the herbal of Dodoens. Of this, he wrote "so I inherit a taste for botany from very ancient blood". He studied at a school near Halifax and by the age of eight had established a passion for plants.

He attended medical school at the University of Edinburgh in 1780, where he would have at least been aware of the influence of John Hope, then Professor of Medicine and Botany. (Note: However, Markham's name does not appear in Professor Hope's class lists) At Edinburgh he became friendly with James Edward Smith, another student, who would found and become president of the Linnean Society. Smith gathered a circle of friends together to form the Society for the Investigation of Natural History in March 1782. Smith described Markham as 'a young man of large fortune from Leeds, who studies physic as an amusement, and is an excellent botanist; but has just left Edinburgh and 'tis uncertain whether he will return'. It is unclear whether he completed his studies and graduated, not uncommon at that time among those with a substantial inheritance.

About this time, Richard Markham changed his name to Richard Salisbury. Later, Markham wrote to Joseph Banks that in 1785, Anna Salisbury, an elderly spinster without heirs who was a distant relative of his mother and who shared his love of plants, had settled on him a substantial amount of money. The condition was that he adopt her name, which she stated was an ancient and illustrious Welsh family. He was never able to produce any documentation to this effect and later it was claimed that he had admitted to having invented the story. (Note: Markham wrote "In the year 1780 I first became acquainted with Mrs. Anna Salisbury a very old maiden lady, who in 1785 gave me £10,000 three per cents, to pursue my studies in botany and gardening, on condition of my taking the name of Salisbury only, out of respect for the memory of her brother John Salisbury of Exeter deceased". Elsewhere he explained "Mrs. Anna Salisbury was a connexion of my maternal grandmother who was Hester Salisbury of Wales")

Following his studies, Markham, now Salisbury pursued the life of country gentleman of wealth at Chapel Allerton, Leeds, one of his father's estates. He developed substantial gardens and a large hothouse and a circle of wealthy local landowners who were equally enthusiastic about horticulture. For instance, he received an invitation to redesign the grounds of Harewood House. At the same time he developed a corresponding relationship with many leading botanists, and visited herbaria in Paris and London. There, he visited Banks, who remained his loyal friend for the rest of his life. He received recognition through election to the Royal Society and the Linnean Society in 1787.

Salisbury married Caroline Staniforth in 1796. One child, Eleanor, was born to the couple in 1797; the two separated shortly thereafter. Salisbury had apparently misrepresented his finances when he had proposed marriage, and had large debts at the time of his daughter's birth and had declared bankruptcy for dubious purposes. His honesty in legal and financial matters seems to have been questionable, if not devious. He apparently recovered financially by 1802, when he bought a house.

Salisbury contributed annotations to Edward Rudge's Plantarum Guianæ Icones (1805–07), and descriptions to Paradisus Londinensis (1806–09). The latter was illustrated by William Hooker, and contained the genus name Hookera honouring him. Smith improperly renamed the genus Brodiaea a few years later, after his wealthy "friend and patron", James Brodie of Brodie.

In 1809, Salisbury was appointed the first honorary secretary of the Horticultural Society. His successor Joseph Sabine found he had left the accounts in disarray. He moved to London around this time; his small garden contained a large number of exotic and rare plants.

Salisbury opposed the use of Linnaeus's systema sexuale for classifying plants, which was one reason why others ignored his work. Another was the belief that Salisbury had behaved unethically. The censure was later reported as:

"there was a tacit understanding on the part of the botanical leaders of the period, including Brown, Banks, and Smith, that Salisbury's botanical work and names should, as far as possible, be ignored"—Journal of Botany, 1886, p. 297."

In July 1818, an anonymous article appeared in The Monthly Review (86: 298–305) that was highly critical of Brown's account of plants acquired on a Congo expedition. Brown and others had little difficulty discerning that the author was Salisbury, prompting the former to complain to Smith the following month. However, there was already considerable ill feeling between the two botanists, due to Salisbury's use of Brown's work, but also his falling out with Smith, from the early days of the century. Smith referred to Salisbury's contributions as "trash" in 1807.

In addition to the allegations of plagiarism, Salisbury was known as a man who was difficult to get along with, was frequently involved in disputes with his contemporaries and was shunned by many botanists of his day. Nonetheless, he was a meticulous botanist and illustrator who contributed significantly to both the science and to horticulture. His contributions to English botany include a Corsican pine (Pinus nigra) delivered to Kew Gardens, and his herbarium was also passed there via his adopted son, Matthew Burchill. Salisbury had met Alphonse de Candolle in his later years, and offered to leave him his inheritance if he would take the name of 'Salisbury'.

He died in 1829. His manuscripts were obtained by John Edward Gray, who published part as Genera Plantarum and deposited the remaining documents at the British Museum. The portrait in pencil by Burchell (1817), acquired by Kew, and Smith's genus Salisburia, a synonym for Ginkgo, denote his part in the history of British botany. At that time (1797), he was still on good terms with Smith, who wrote "named in honour of Richard Anthony Salisbury, Esq., F.R.S. and F.L.S. of whose acuteness and indefatigable zeal in the service of botany no testimony is necessary in this society, nor in any place which his writings have reached".

== Work ==
Salisbury's first known publication was his Icones stirpium rariorum descriptionibus illustratae (1791), a collection of 11 hand coloured plates, including the first description of Canna flaccida, which therefore bears his name as the botanical authority Salisb..This was followed in 1796 with an account of the plants on his Chapel Allerton estate.

Salisbury was unpopular with his contemporaries for his rejection, (subsequently demonstrated to be correct) of the Linnaen system of plant classification, the systema sexuale still supported by Smith among others. Salisbury promoted the natural system instead. In 1796, at his own expense, Salisbury published a comprehensive account of the plants at Chapel Allerton He published a manuscript in 1809 under the name of a friend, Joseph Knight, entitled On the cultivation of the plants belonging to the natural order of Proteeae, which contained only 13 pages related to cultivation techniques, but over 100 pages of taxonomic revision. However, it turned out that the work had nonetheless freely plagiarised the work of yet another botanist (Brown) who was at odds with Salisbury. Salisbury had memorised the plant names from Robert Brown's reading of his On the Proteaceae of Jussieu to the Linnean Society of London in the first quarter of 1809, which was subsequently published in March 1810. Knight and Salisbury thus beat Brown to print and claimed priority for the names that Brown had authored.

Salisbury was accused of plagiarism, ostracised from botanical circles, and his publications were largely ignored during his lifetime. Samuel Goodenough wrote:

How shocked was I to see Salisbury's surreptitious anticipation of Brown's paper on New Holland plants, under the name and disguise of Mr. Hibbert's gardener! Oh it is too bad!

Robert Brown himself wrote of Salisbury:

I scarcely know what to think of him except that he stands between a rogue and a fool.

Although Salisbury's generic names have almost all been overturned, many of his specific epithets have been reinstated; since the nominal author was Knight, not Salisbury, Knight is now considered the author of a great many Proteaceae species.

=== List of selected published works ===
Books

- Salisbury, R. A. (1791). Icones stirpium rariorum descriptionibus illustratae. London: William Bulmer.
- Salisbury, R. A. (1796). Prodromus stirpium in horto ad Chapel Allerton vigentium (in Latin). London: self.
- Dissertatio botanica de Erica, 1800
- Text of The Paradisus Londinensis, 1805–1808
- Salisbury, Richard Anthony; Gray, J. E. (1866). The Genera of Plants: A Fragment Containing Part of Liriogamoe (published posthumously). John Van Voorst. (also available here on Internet Archive and here at Biodiversity Library)

Transactions of the Horticultural Society of London 1820 (contributions 1806–1811)

  - On the cultivation of the Polianthes Tuberosa. 1806. p. 41. In Horticultural Society of London (1820)
  - Observations on the different species of Dahlia. 1808. p. 84. In Horticultural Society of London (1820)
  - A short account of Nectarines and Peaches. 1808. p. 103. In Horticultural Society of London (1820)
  - Some account of the Red Doyenne Pear. 1811. p. 230. In Horticultural Society of London (1820)
  - On the cultivation of rare plants. 1812. p. 261. In Horticultural Society of London (1820)
  - On the cultivation of the Jamrosade. 1811. p. Appendix 11. In Horticultural Society of London (1820)
  - On the vegetation of high mountains. 1811. p. Appendix 15. In Horticultural Society of London (1820)
  - Description of a bank for Alpine Plants. 1811. p. Appendix 15. In Horticultural Society of London (1820)

== Bibliography ==
=== Books ===
- Desmond, Ray (1994) [1977]. "Salisbury, Richard Anthony (né Markham)". Dictionary of British and Irish botanists and horticulturalists: including plant collectors, flower painters and garden designers (2nd ed.). London: Taylor & Francis. ISBN 9780850668438.
- Gillow, Joseph (1885). "Salisbury, Richard Anthony". A literary and biographical history or bibliographical dictionary of the English Catholics from 1534. Vol. 5. Burns & Oates. pp. 468–470.
- Gray, J E (1866). Preface. pp. iii–vi., in Salisbury & Gray (1866)
- Horticultural Society of London (1820). Transactions, Volume 1 (3 ed.). London.

=== Articles ===
- Britten, James (1886). "Hookera vs. Brodiaea: with some remarks on nomenclature". Journal of Botany, British and Foreign. 24: 49–53.
- Higgins, Wesley; Alrich, Peggy (1 November 2015). "Early Illustrators of Cypripedium". Orchids. 84: 660–671.
- Mabberley, D. J. (1980). "Generic Names Published in Salisbury's Reviews of Robert Brown's Works". Taxon. 29 (5/6): 597–606. Bibcode:1980Taxon..29..597M. doi:10.2307/1220331. JSTOR 122033.

=== Websites ===
- Boulger, George Simonds (1897). "Salisbury, Richard Anthony" . In Lee, Sidney (ed.). Dictionary of National Biography. Vol. 50. London: Smith, Elder & Co.
- Allen, D. E. (2004). "Salisbury [formerly Markham], Richard Anthony (1761–1829)". Oxford Dictionary of National Biography (online ed.). Oxford University Press. doi:10.1093/ref:odnb/24542. (Subscription, Wikipedia Library access or UK public library membership required.)
- Edinburgh (2022). "Richard Anthony Markham (1780)". University of Edinburgh: Historical Alumni Collection.
- Christie's (2014). "Salisbury, Richard Anthony (1761-1829). Icones stirpium rariorum descriptionibus illustratae. London: William Bulmer, 1791". Fine Printed Books.(Plate from Salisbury (1791))
