= The Himalayans =

The Himalayans may refer to:

- The Himalayans (American band), a 1990s American band
- The Himalayans (Nepali band), a 1970s Nepali rock band in Hong Kong

== See also ==
- Himalaya (disambiguation)
- Himalayan (disambiguation)
- Himalayas (band), a Welsh band
