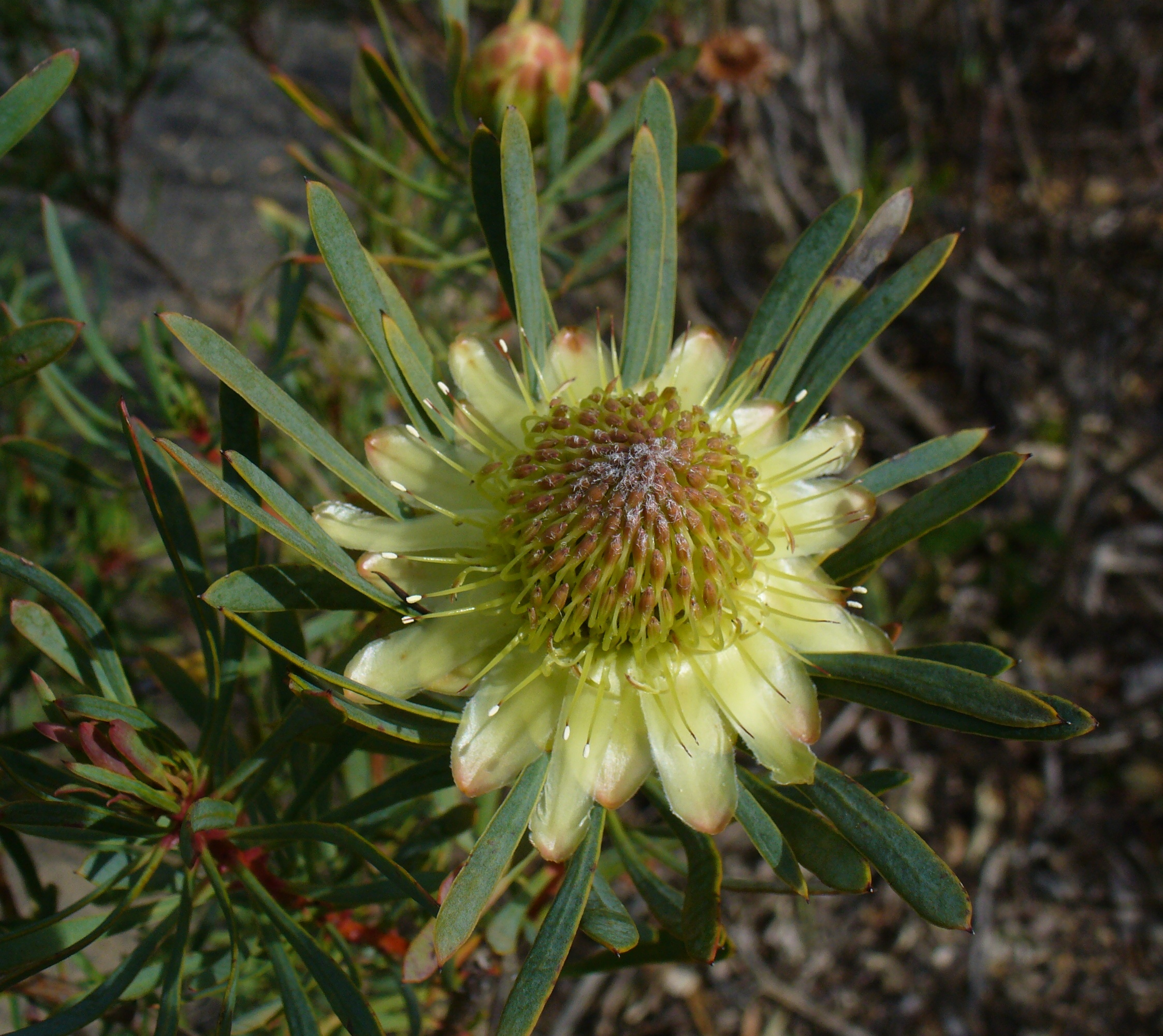

Conservation status
- Vulnerable (IUCN 3.1)

Scientific classification
- Kingdom: Plantae
- Clade: Embryophytes
- Clade: Tracheophytes
- Clade: Angiosperms
- Clade: Eudicots
- Order: Proteales
- Family: Proteaceae
- Genus: Protea
- Species: P. scolymocephala

Binomial name
- Protea scolymocephala (L.) Reichard
- Protea scolymocephala distribution Extant (resident)

Synonyms
- List: Leucadendron scolymocephalum L.; Protea angustifolia Salisb.; Erodendrum scolymiflorum Salisb. ex. Knight; Protea scolymus Thunb.; Scolymocephalus scolymus (Thunb.) Kuntze

= Protea scolymocephala =

Species of flowering plant

Protea scolymocephala, also known as the thistle protea or thistle sugarbush, is a flowering plant from the genus Protea native to South Africa.

Other recorded vernacular names for the plant are small green protea or scoly. In the Afrikaans language it is known by the name of kleingroenroos, or alternatively witskollie.

== Taxonomy ==
Protea scolymocephala was first described by Linnaeus as Leucadendron scolymocephalum, but moved to the genus Protea by Johann Jacob Reichard in 1779 or 1780.

== Description ==
It is a small, erect shrub between 0.5 and 1.5 metres (1 ft 8 in and 4 ft 11 in) in height. It has a single main stem, which branches into a large number of secondary stems. The leaves are linear-spatulate and curve upwards. The inflorescence is yellowish green and relatively small, some 3.5–4.5 cm (1.4–1.8 in) in diameter. The species flowers in Spring, between June or July to November, with the peak in early Spring, between August and September. This species is monoecious with both sexes in each flower. The fruits are persistent, which means they are retained on the plant after drying. The seeds stored within the fire-resistant, dried fruit, and when released after fires are dispersed by means of wind.

Individual plants generally have a generational length of some 20 years.

== Distribution ==
P. scolymocephala is endemic to the Western Cape province of South Africa, where it is found from approximately the Olifants River and the Gifberg in the north, through Cape Town, to Hermanus in the east, and from Kleinmond to Hawston in the west. It grows on the Slangkop headland on the Cape Peninsula.

== Ecology ==
It grows in sandy flats (sandveld) and coastal lowlands, and is often found growing near drainage lines. It is found from altitudes of 0 to 400 metres (0 to 1,312 ft).

The mature plants are usually completely killed by wildfires, but the seeds can survive such events within the fire-resistant inflorescences.

It is pollinated by birds and rodents. The roots are eaten by mole rats.

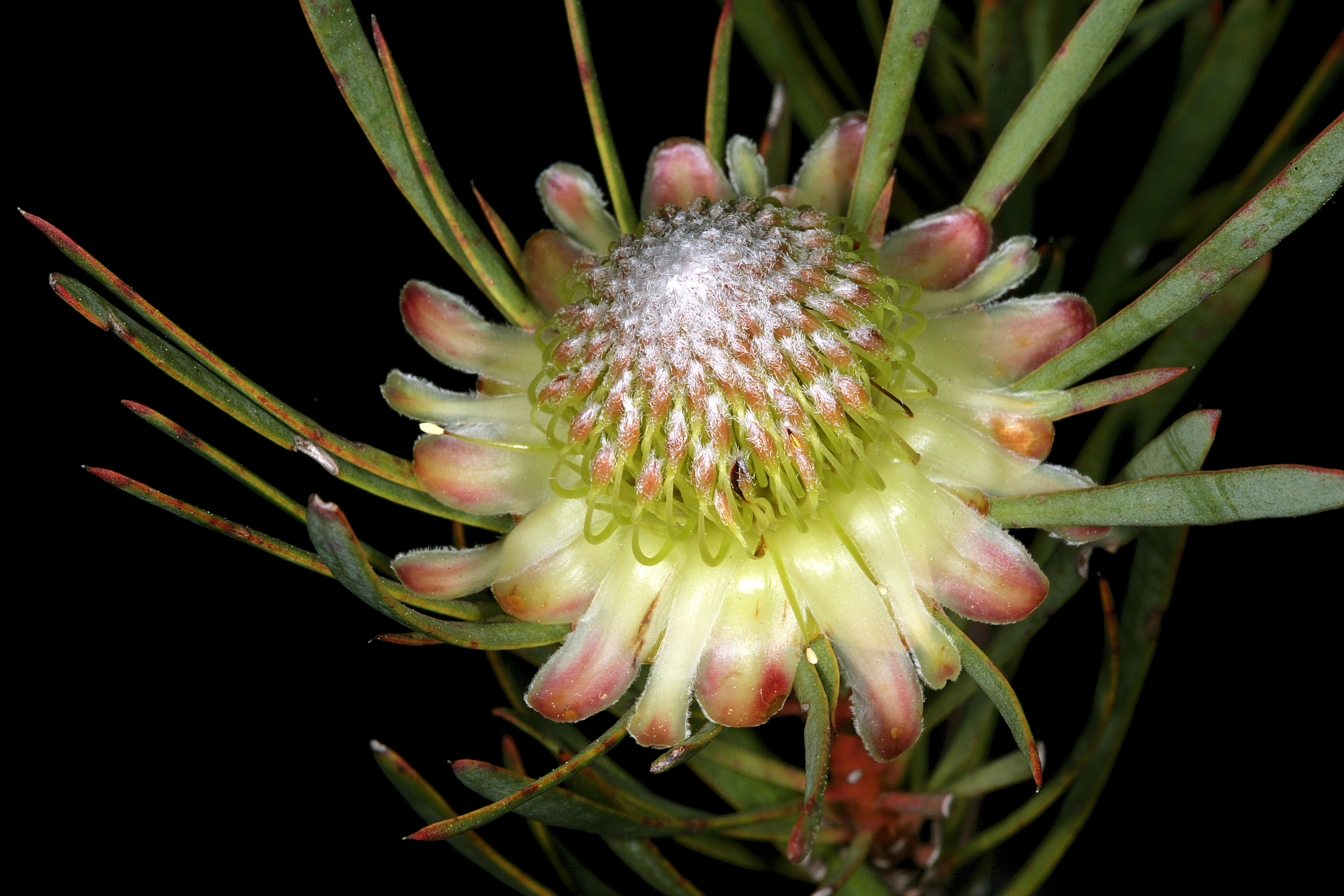
Protea scolymocephala cultivated at Paarlberg Nature Reserve, Paarl, Western Cape, South Africa

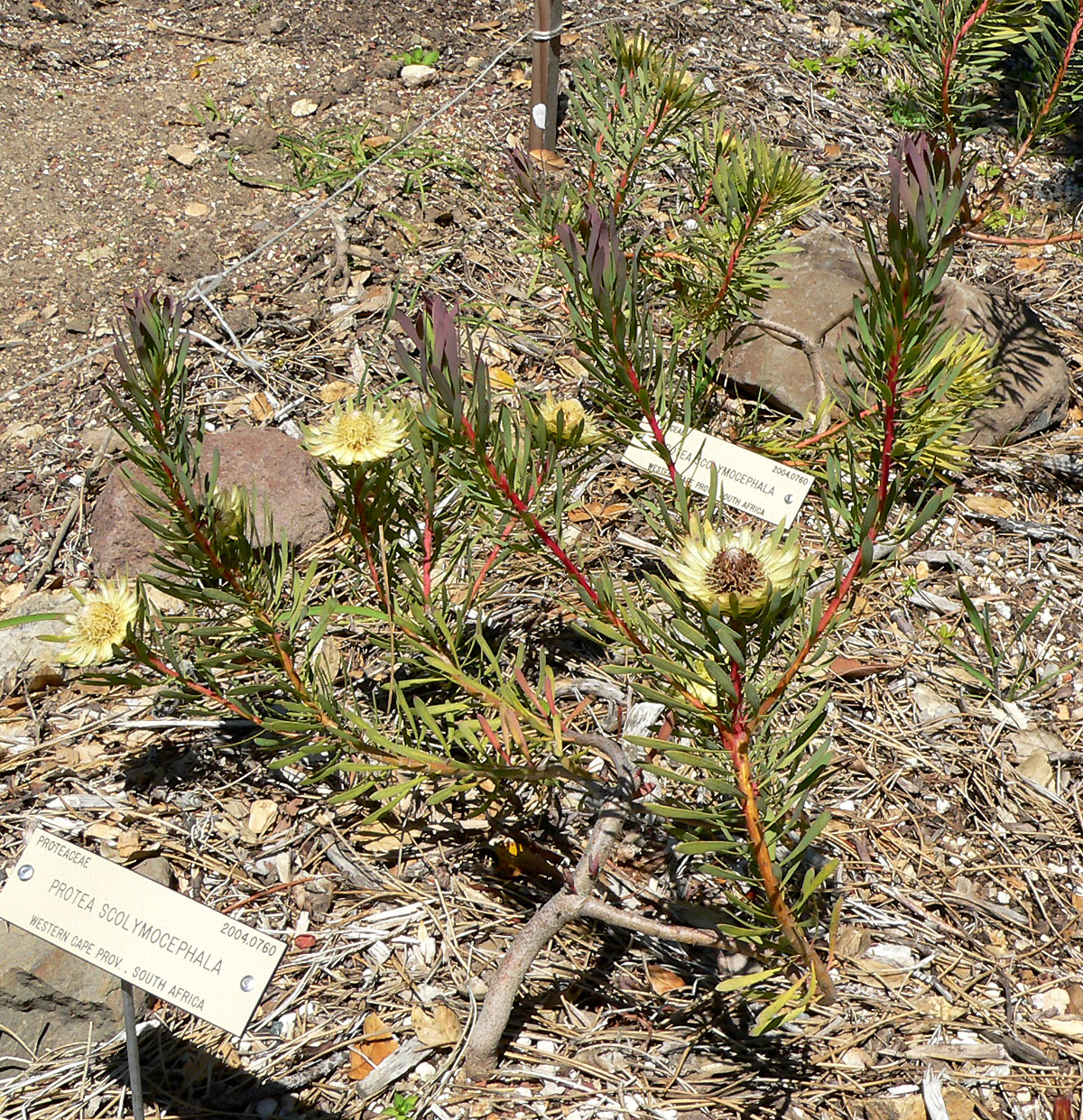
Habitus of plant cultivated at the University of California Botanical Garden in Berkeley

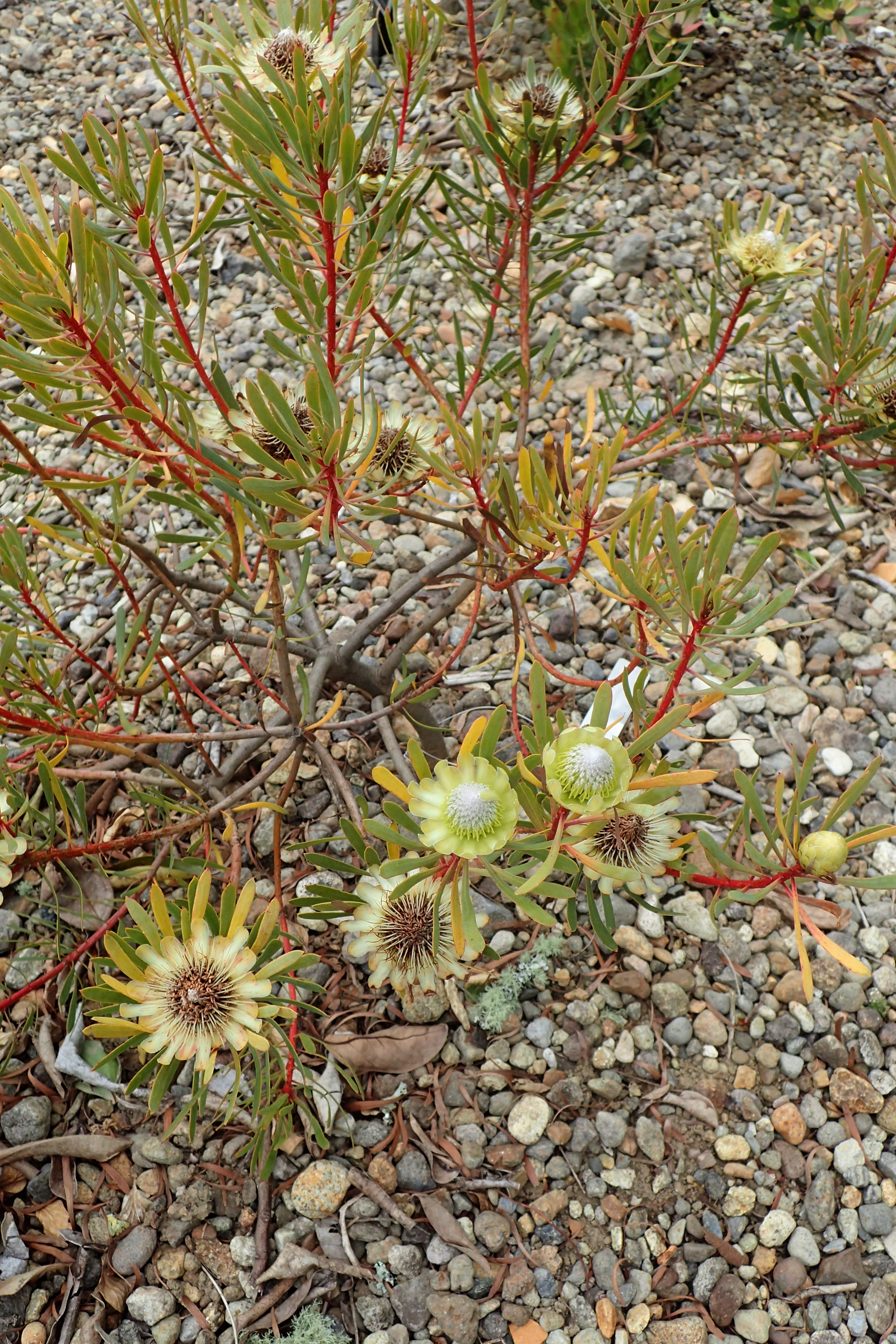
Habitus at Auckland Botanic Gardens, New Zealand

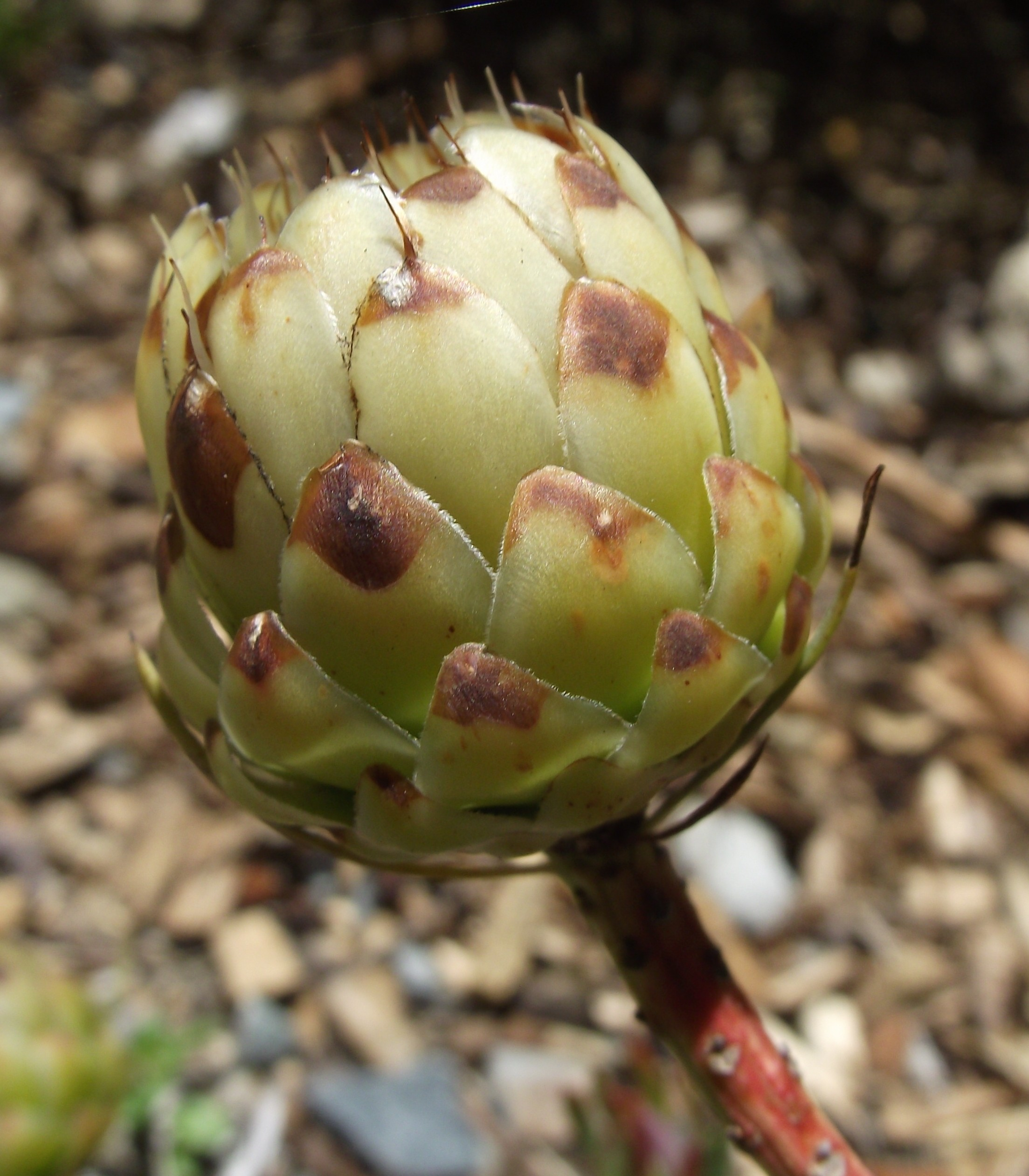
Developing inflorescence at the University of California Botanical Garden

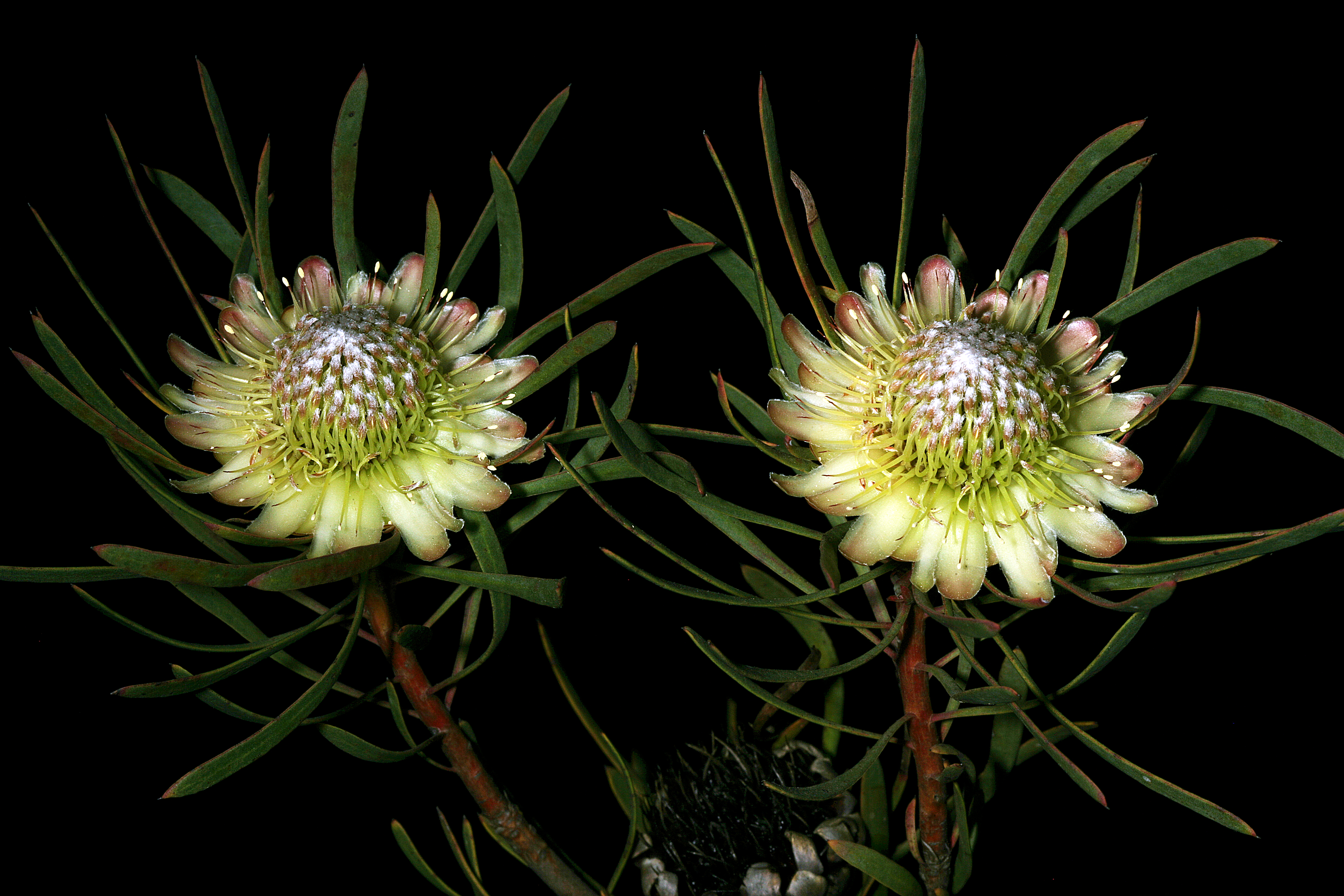
Leaves and flowerheads at the Caledon Wild Flower Show in Caledon, Western Cape

== Conservation ==
In 1998 it was said to be largely extirpated in the southern part of its range, but still locally common in the north. The status of the population of this species was first assessed as 'vulnerable' by the South African National Biodiversity Institute (SANBI) in 2005. In the 2019 SANBI assessment the authors state that the population is decreasing and that the situation of the population is such that its status might require upgrading to that of 'endangered' in the near future, should current trends in the northern part of its range continue. Its range has decreased by some 40% over the last sixty years. Over the sixty year time period, the range has furthermore been decreased by urban expansion, agriculture, invasive vegetation, too frequent wildfires, groundwater extraction and increased mole rat activity. The expansion of rooibos tea plantations and arable land for the production of potatoes are specific present-day threats causing habitat loss in the northern part of this species' range, and likely are the greatest threats to its survival. Other possible problems identified as threats to the survival of this species are direct effects from invasive species, over-harvesting due to gathering of plant (parts), habitat loss, habitat degradation and other intrinsic factors such as changes in native species dynamics.
