= HMS Himalaya =

Two ships of the Royal Navy have been named HMS Himalaya:

- HMS Himalaya (1854) was a troopship and coaling hulk. She was sold in 1920 and sunk in 1940
- HMS Himalaya (1914) was an armed merchant cruiser

== See also ==
- SS Himalaya, steamships with the name
- Himalaya (disambiguation)
