= SS Himalaya =

Several ships have been named Himalaya, after the mountain range in Asia:

- HMS Himalaya, a P&O passenger liner, that became the large troopship in 1854
- SS Himalaya, a British India Steam Navigation Company passenger-cargo liner
- SS Himalaya (1892), a P&O passenger liner, sold to the Admiralty in 1916 as a seaplane carrier and repurchased in 1919.
- SS Himalaya (1948), a P&O passenger liner

== See also ==
- HMS Himalaya, ships of the Royal Navy
- Himalaya (disambiguation)
