= Economic history of Africa =

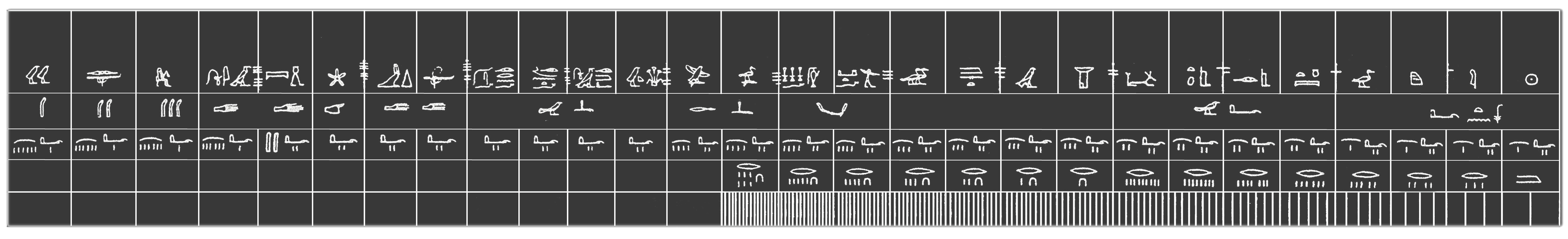
Ancient Egyptian units of measurement also served as units of currency.

The earliest humans were hunter gatherers who were living in small, family groupings. Even then there was considerable trade that could cover long distances. Archaeologists have found that evidence of trade in luxury items like precious metals and shells across the entirety of the continent.

African economic history often focuses on explanations of poverty and obscures other aspects such as the achievements of African farmers, traders and states, including improvements in food security, and episodes of economic growth.

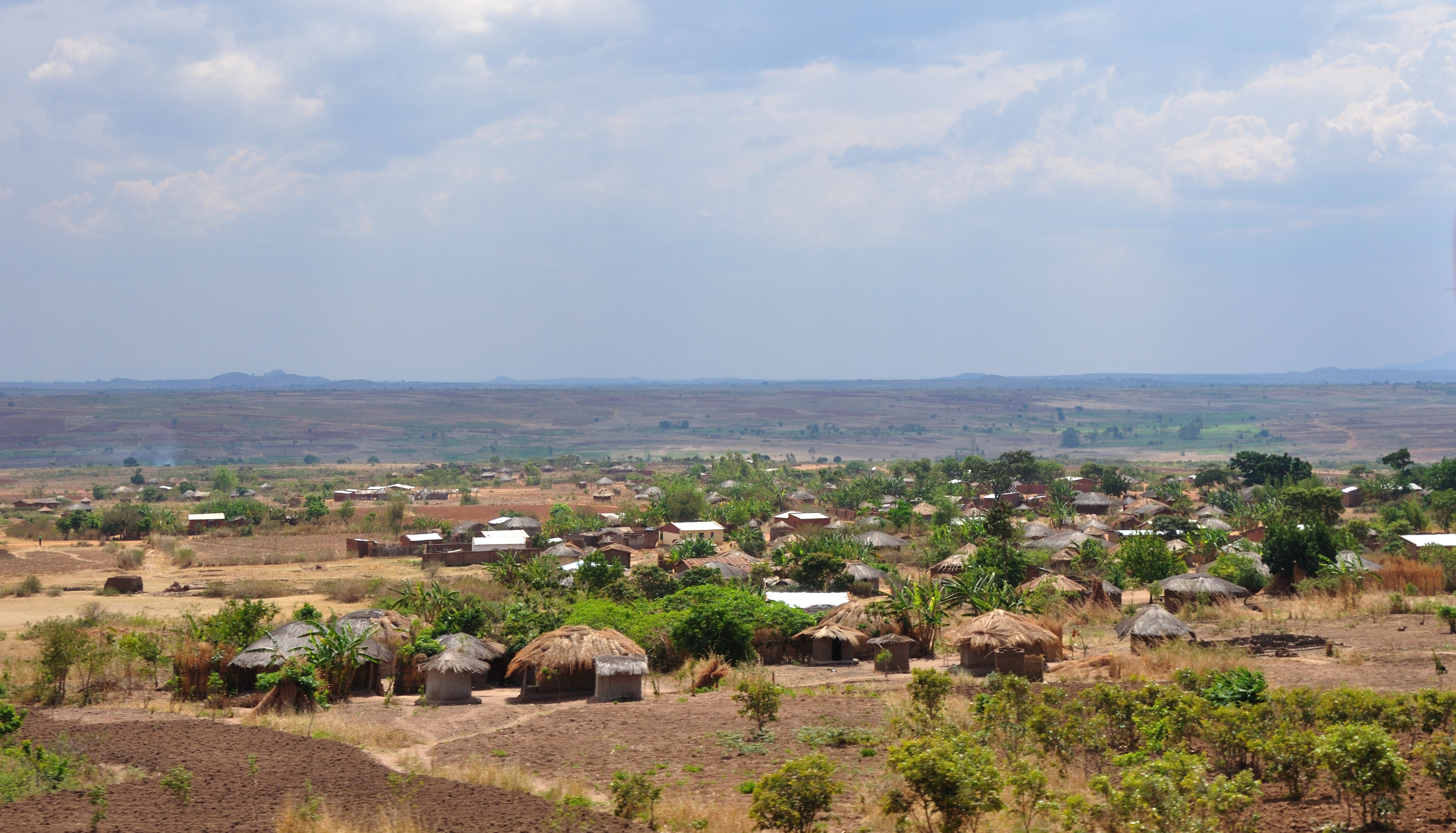
Farms in Malawi, 2010

== Ancient history ==
Africa has the longest and oldest economic history. As soon as human societies came into existence, so did economic activity. Earliest humans were hunter gatherers living in small, family groups. Even then there was considerable trade that could cover long distances. Archaeologists have found that evidence of trade in luxury items like metals and shells across the entirety of the continent were the main trades of the Berber people, lived in dry areas and became nomadic herders, while in the savannah grasslands, cultivated crops and thus permanent settlement were possible. Agriculture supported large towns, and eventually large trade networks developed between the towns.

=== Origins of agriculture ===
The first agriculture in Africa began around the Sahel and the south of the Sahara Desert, which in 5200 BC was far more moist and densely populated than today. Several native species were domesticated, most importantly pearl millet, sorghum and cowpeas, which spread through West Africa and the Sahel. The Sahara at this time was like the Sahel today. Its wide open fields made cultivation easy, but the poor soil and limited rain made intensive farming impossible. The local crops were also not ideal and produced fewer calories than those of other regions. These factors limited surpluses and kept populations sparse and scattered.

North Africa took a very different route from the southern regions. Climatically it is linked to the Middle East and the Fertile Crescent, and the agricultural techniques of that region were adopted wholesale. This included a different set of crops, such as wheat, barley, and grapes. North Africa was also blessed by one of the richest agricultural regions in the world in the Nile River valley. With the arrival of agriculture, the Nile region became one of the most densely populated areas in the world, and Egypt home to one of the first civilizations.

The drying of the Sahara created a formidable barrier between the northern and southern portions of the continent. Two important exceptions were Nubian Sudan, which was linked to Egypt by the Nile and Ethiopia, which could trade with the northern regions over the Red Sea. Powerful states grew up in these regions such as Kush in Nubia (modern day Northern Sudan and Southern Egypt) and Aksum in Ethiopia. Especially from Nubia, ideas and technologies from the Middle East and Europe reached the rest of Africa.

Historians believe that iron working developed independently in Africa. Unlike other continents Africa did not have a period of copper and bronze working before their Iron Age. Copper is quite rare in Africa while iron is quite common. In Nubia and Ethiopia, iron, trade, and agricultural surpluses lead to the establishment of cities and civilizations.

=== The Bantu expansion ===
Ordinarily, in the sparsely populated areas, this same period saw the expansion of the Bantu speaking peoples. The Bantu expansion began in Southern Cameroon around 4000 years ago. Bantu languages are spoken there today and there is archaeological evidence for incoming Neolithic farmers in Northern Gabon c. 3800 BC. It is known that Bantu expansion was massive and extremely rapid, but its exact engine remains controversial. This period predated iron, which appears in the archaeological record by 2500 BC.

One of the early expansions of Bantu was the migration of the Bubi to Fernando Po (Bioko). They were still using stone technology at first. The difficulties of cutting down the equatorial forest for farming have led to the suggestion that the primary expansion was along river valleys, a hypothesis supported by studies of fish names. Another factor may have been the arrival of southeast-Asian food crops, notably the AAB plantain, the cocoyam and the water-yam. Linguistic reconstructions suggest that the only livestock possessed by the proto-Bantu was the goat. Over the centuries the entire southern half of Africa was covered with the group, excluding only the Kalahari desert. Their expansion only ended relatively recently. In the year 1000, Arab traders described that the Bantu had not reached as far as Mozambique, and European settlers observed the Bantu expansion into South Africa under the Zulu and others, yet there's no archaeological evidence that supports their claims instead on the contrary the evidence indicates Bantu speakers's presence very much earlier by over 1800 years and over 1400 years before the first European settlement in the South African regions of Mozambique and South Africa respectively.

The importation Bantu pastoralism reshaped the continent's economy. Sometime in the first millennium, an equally important change began as crops began to arrive from Southeast Asia. The Indian Ocean has always been far more open to trade than the turbulent Atlantic and Pacific. Traders could ride the monsoon winds west early in the year and return east on them later. It is guessed that these crops first arrived in Madagascar, which also adopted Southeast Asian languages, sometime between AD 300 and 800. From the island, the crops crossed to African Great Lakes region. They included many crops, the most important being the banana.

The banana and other crops allowed for more intensive cultivation in the tropical regions of Africa, this was most notable in the Great Lakes region, an area with excellent soil, that saw many cities and states form, their populations being fed largely

== Trade routes ==
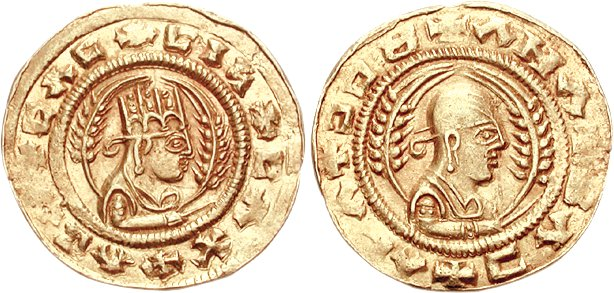
Aksumite gold coin of Endybis

Early trans-Saharan trade routes

While some level of trade had been ongoing, the rise of cities and empires made it far more central to the African economy. North Africa was central to the trade of the entire Mediterranean region. Outside of Egypt, this trade was mostly controlled by the Phoenicians who came to dominate North Africa, with Carthage becoming their most important city. The Greeks controlled much of the eastern trade, including along the Red Sea with Ethiopia. In this region a number of Greek trading cities that were established acted as a conduit for their civilization and learning.

The Egyptian (and later, Roman) city of Alexandria (founded by Alexander the Great in 334 BC), was one of the hubs for Mediterranean trade for many centuries. Well into the 19th century Egypt remained one of the most developed parts of the world.

Nubia in Sudan likewise traded with interior African countries such as Chad and Libya, as well as with Egypt, China, India and the Arabian peninsula.

For most of the 1st millennium AD, the Axumite Kingdom in Ethiopia and Eritrea had a powerful navy and trading links reaching as far as the Byzantine Empire and India. Between the 14th and 17th centuries, the Ajuran Sultanate centered in modern-day Somalia practiced hydraulic engineering and developed new systems for agriculture and taxation, which continued to be used in parts of the Horn of Africa as late as the 19th century.

On the east coast of the continent Swahili traders linked the region into an Indian Ocean trading network, bringing imports of Chinese pottery and Indian fabrics in exchange for gold, ivory, and slaves. Swahili Kingdoms created a prosperous trade empire, where occupied the territory of modern-day Kenya, Tanzania and Uganda. Swahili cities were important trading ports for trade with the Middle East and Far East.

In the interior of Africa, trade was far more limited. Low population densities made profitable commerce difficult. The massive barrier of the Congo rainforests were more imposing than the Sahara, blocking trade through the center of the continent.

It was the arrival of the Islamic armies that transformed the economies of much of Africa. Though Islam had comparatively little impact on North Africa where large cities, literacy, and centralized states had been the norm, Muslims were far more effective at penetrating the Sahara than Christians had been. This was largely due to the camel, which had carried the Arab expansion and would soon after carry large amounts of trade across the desert.

A series of states developed in the Sahel on the southern edge of the Sahara which made immense profits from trading across the Sahara. The first of these was the Empire of Ghana, reaching it peak in the 12th century. Soon, others such as the Mali Empire and Kanem-Bornu, also arose in the region. The main trade of these states was gold, which was plentiful in Guinea. Also important was the trans-Saharan slave trade that shipped large numbers of slaves to North Africa.

=== 600–1600 AD ===
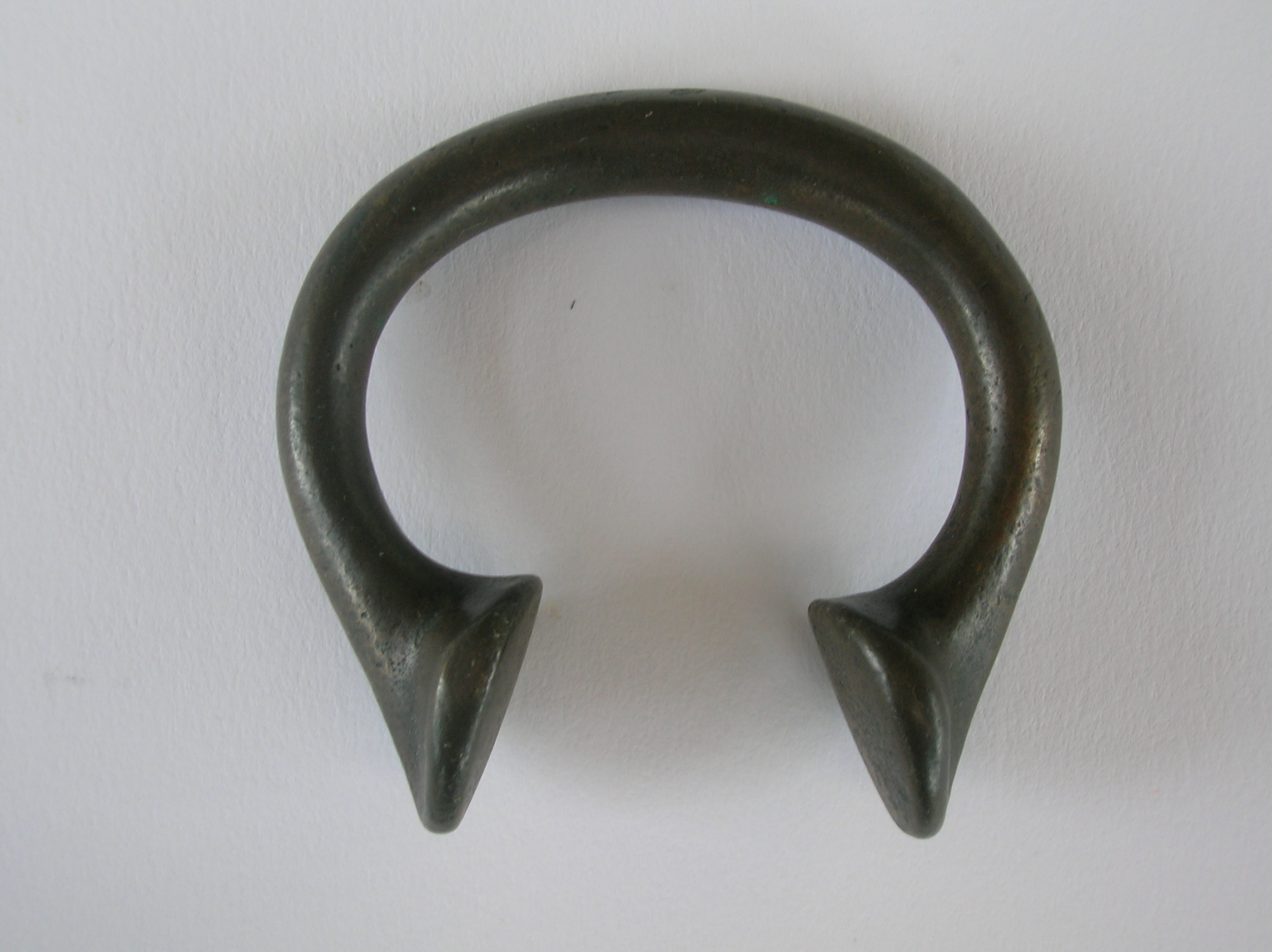
An Okpoho variety of Manilla from the Igbo people of southeastern Nigeria

Many wealthy empires grew around coastal areas or large rivers that served as part of important trade routes. The kingdoms of Mali and Songhai Empire grew along the Niger River between 1200 and 1590. Berber traders from the Sahel—a region south of the Sahara Desert—traded dates, copper, horses, weapons and cloth that they brought from north Africa in Camel trains. Trade with the Berber people, and other groups, drove the growth of the Ghana empire, which traded its gold, kola nuts, and slaves. West Africans created a demand for salt, which was collected at desert oases, and which they used to preserve food as well as for seasoning it.

In 1324, Mansa Musa, the king of Mali, made a historically famous Hajj (pilgrimage) to Mecca. There was an enormous group organized to undertake the Hajj with the king. It included "60,000 men, including 1200 servants" and records show that Mansa Musa gave out so much gold in Egypt, that its economy became depressed.

Between 1000 and 1500, the forests of West Africa also became part of trade networks, particularly under the reigns of the Yoruba kings. Ifé was a vital trade town, along the route from the tropical forests to Djenné, a major trade centre in Sudan, near other large trade cities such as Timbuktu and Gao. Ifé's location also placed it near Benin and the Atlantic Ocean. Yoruba civilization was supported by cities surrounded by farmed land, but extensive trade development made it wealthy.

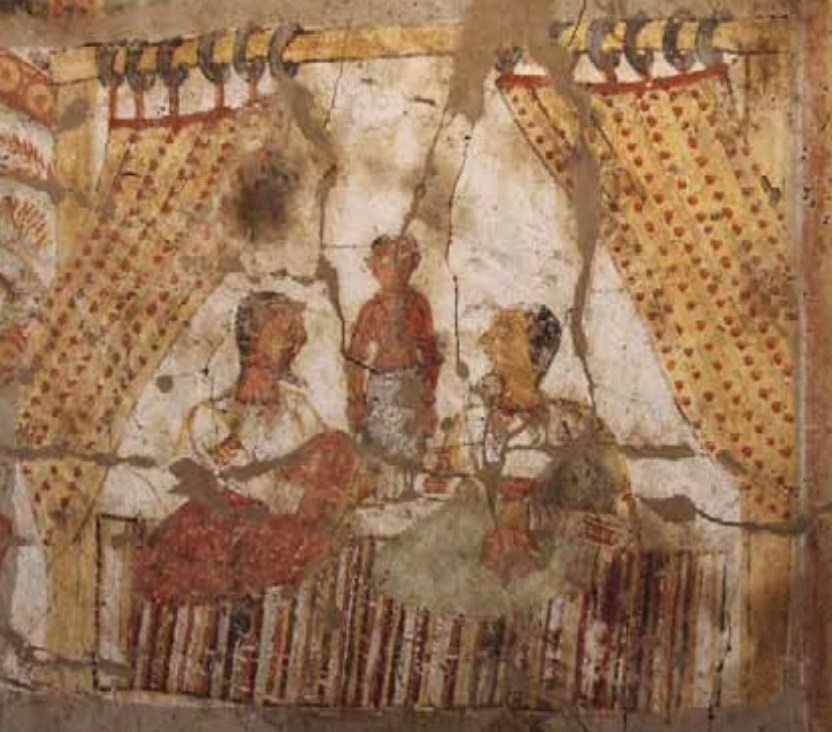
Mural from Old Dongola, the former capital of Makuria, depicting a financial deal

By 1000, the Bantu language-speaking people of Zimbabwe and Southern Africa developed extensive overseas trade with lands as far away as China and India, from which they received porcelain, beads, and Persian and Arab pots. They traded domesticated beef (rather than meat from game animals), iron, and ivory and gold. The city of Great Zimbabwe, founded around 1100, was the centre of the Shona kingdom until around 1400.

Much trade in the forest kingdoms was done at the local level, typically by ordinary Yoruba people at local markets. In some towns these were held every 3 or 4 days. Cloth, vegetables, meat, and other goods were traded, and paid for using small seashells called cowries which were imported from East Africa. Bars of copper and iron, called manilas, were produced in standard shapes to be used as currency. Other items used in trade as a form of currency included salt, cloth, and bars of gold.

Trade with the Middle East had begun as early as ancient Egypt. Islam was introduced to the Horn region early on from the Arabian peninsula, shortly after the hijra. Zeila's two-mihrab Masjid al-Qiblatayn dates to the 7th century. The spread of Islam brought Arab traders as far as Morocco. The Adal Sultanate in the Horn region also maintained bilateral relations with the Ottoman Empire. The institutional framework for long-distance trade across political and cultural boundaries had long been strengthened by the adoption of Islam as a cultural and moral foundation for trust among and with traders. On the Swahili Coast to the southeast, the Sultan of Malindi sent envoys to the Chinese imperial palace in Nanjing Yongle bearing a giraffe and other exotic gifts.

== European influence ==
=== Early European colonization ===
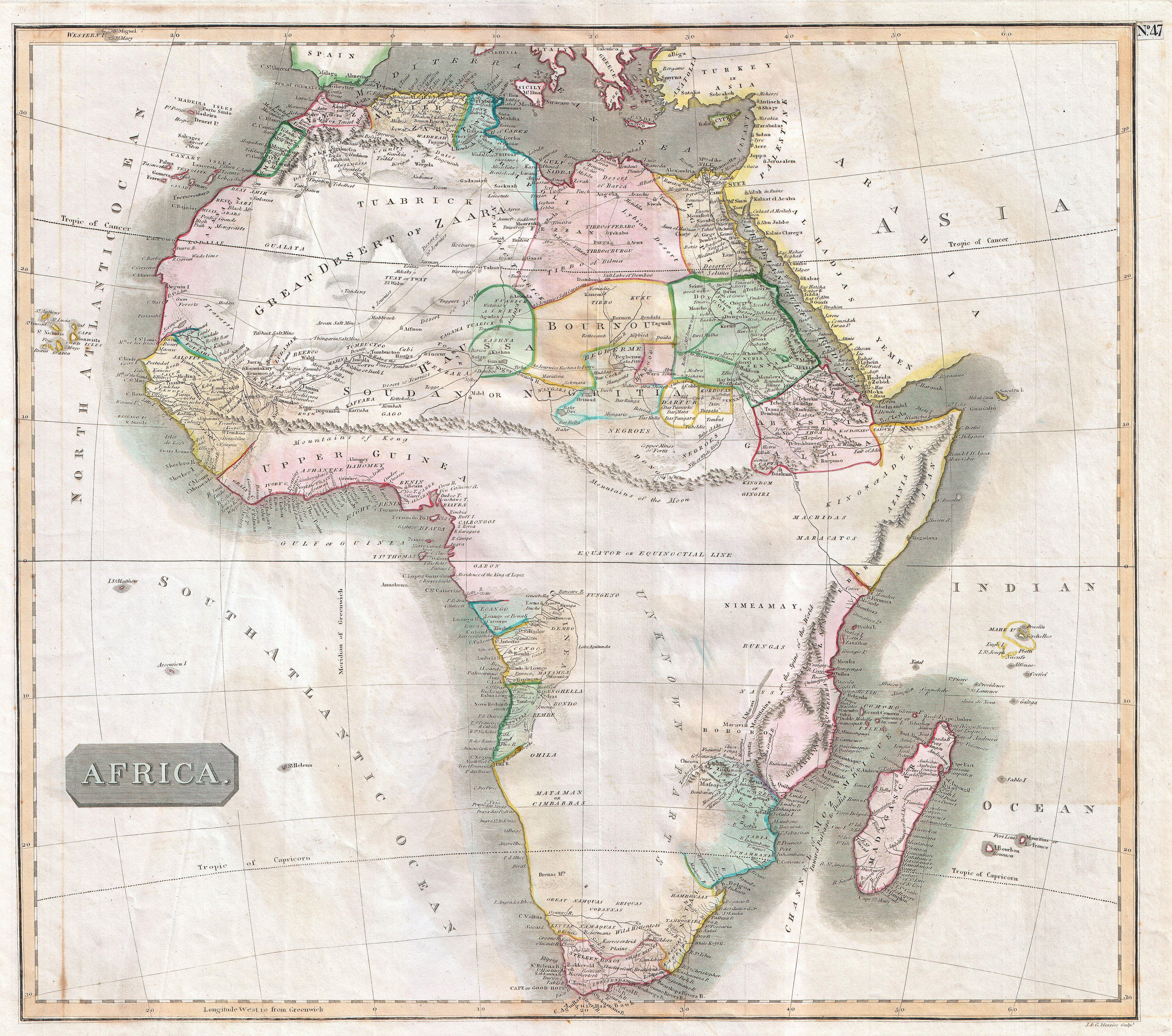
A map of Africa by John Thomson, 1813

The earliest European colonists settled in North Africa in ancient times. These colonists included Phoenicians and Greeks. Settlers from ancient Athens and other parts of Greece established themselves along the Mediterranean coast of North Africa. They were later followed by colonists of the Roman Empire. Rome's colonies "served as a prototype" for later European colonial movement into the continent.

Portugal was the first European empire to penetrate deep into Sub-Saharan Africa to establish colonies. Portuguese prince Henry the Navigator advanced Portuguese exploration of Africa, driven by two desires: to spread Christianity, and to establish Africa as a bastion of Christianity against the Ottoman Empire, which was making many Africans convert to Islam. Africa was exploited for commercial purposes because of another Portuguese goal: to find a route to India, which would open the entire Indian Ocean region to direct trade with Portugal. Conquest of territory in Africa also meant that the Portuguese could use African gold to finance travel along this new trade route.

The Portuguese began significant trading with West Africa in the 15th century. This trade was primarily for the same commodities the Arabs had bought—gold, ivory, and slaves. The Portuguese sold the Africans Indian cloth and European manufactured goods but refused to sell them guns. Soon, however, other European powers such as France, Denmark, the Netherlands and Britain were developing their own trade with Africa, and they had fewer restrictions. The major European imperial powers in Africa were Portugal, Great Britain, France, and to a lesser extent Germany, Belgium, Spain and Italy. Portugal's presence in Africa as an imperial power lasted until the 1970s, when the last of its former colonies declared independence after years of war.

The Atlantic Ocean had long been all but impenetrable to the galleys that plied the Mediterranean. That any ship needed to pass thousands of kilometers of waterless desert before reaching any populated regions also made trade impossible. These barriers were overcome by the development of the caravel in Europe. Previously, trade with Sub-Saharan Africa could only be conducted through North African middlemen. Now Europeans could trade directly with the Africans themselves.

This valuable trade lead to rapid change in West Africa. The region had long been agriculturally productive and, especially in western Nigeria, densely populated. The massive profits from trade and the arrival of guns lead to significant centralization and a number of states formed in the region such as the Ashanti Confederacy and Kingdom of Benin. These states became some of the wealthiest and most advanced in Africa. Wealthy merchants began to send their children to European universities and their well armed standing armies could challenge European forces.

Many West-African natives, such as Seedies and Kroomen, served on European ships, and received regular pay, which greatly enhanced their status back home.

=== Atlantic slave trade ===
The modern historiography of slavery has swung between two poles on the question of its demographic and economic effects on Africa as a whole. Early historical accounts of the Atlantic slave trade were largely written for a popular audience by abolitionists and former slaves like Olaudah Equiano who emphasized its profoundly negative effects on African peoples. As the 19th century progressed, accounts of the negative impact of slavery were increasingly used to argue for European colonization of the continent. Conversely, there were those, like the British explorer and geographer William Winwood Reade, who drew on the accounts of slave traders to argue that the effects of slavery were positive.

By the early 20th century, the view of slavery as a negative influence on Africa prevailed among professional academic historians in Europe and the United States. During the decolonization period following World War II, an influential group of scholars, led by J.D. Fage, argued that the negative effects of slavery had been exaggerated, and that the export of slaves had been offset by population growth. Walter Rodney, a specialist on the Upper Guinea Coast, countered that European demand for slaves had vastly increased the economic importance of the slave trade in West Africa, with catastrophic effects. Rodney, who was active in Pan-African independence movements, accused Fage of whitewashing the role of Europeans in Africa; Fage responded by accusing Rodney of nationalist romanticism.

Debates on the economic impacts of the Atlantic trade were further stimulated by the publication of Philip Curtin's The Atlantic Slave Trade: A Census (1969), which argued that 9.566 million slaves were exported from Africa through the Atlantic trade. In the 1970s, the debate on the economic impacts of the Atlantic trade increasingly turned on demographic estimates of slave exports in relation to continental birth rates. Most scholars now believe that Curtin was too conservative in his calculation, with most estimates ranging between 11.5 million to 15.4 million. More recently, John K. Thornton has presented an argument closer to that of Fage, while Joseph Inikori, Patrick Manning and Nathan Nunn have argued that the slave trade had a long-term debilitating impact on African economic development.

Manning, for example, arrived at the following conclusion, after accounting for regional variations in slave exports and assuming an annual African population growth rate of 0.5.%: the population of West Africa would have been 100 million rather than ~50 million in 1850, if not for the combined effects of the external and internal slave trades. Nunn, in a recent econometric analysis of slave-exporting regions in all parts of Africa, found "a robust negative relationship between the number of slaves taken from a country and its subsequent economic development." Nunn argues, moreover, that this cannot be explained by poverty prior to the slave trade, because more densely populated and economically developed parts of Africa regressed behind previously less developed, non-slave exporting areas during the course of the Atlantic, trans-Saharan, Red Sea and Indian Ocean slave trades.

== Colonial era ==
=== 1884–1945 ===
The Berlin Conference (German: Kongokonferenz or "Congo Conference") of 1884–85 regulated European colonization and trade in Africa during the Imperialism period, and coincided with Germany's sudden emergence as an imperial power. Called for by Portugal and organized by Otto von Bismarck, first Chancellor of Germany, its outcome, the General Act of the Berlin Conference, can be seen as the formalization of the Scramble for Africa. The conference ushered in a period of heightened colonial activity by European powers, while simultaneously eliminating most existing forms of African autonomy and self-governance. During this colonial time, the economy of Africa was re-arranged to serve Europe and Europeans, and the European industrial chain began in Africa and ended in European industrial warehouses.

All of Africa would ultimately fall under European colonial rule by 1914, with the exceptions of Ethiopia and Liberia. The partitioning of African territory among European regimes often violated existing boundaries recognized by local Africans. Some of the independent African states affected by the partitioning of the continent included:

- Al-Hajj Umar Ahmadu Sefu
- Ankole
- Asanti
- Bagirmi
- Barotse
- Basutoland
- Benin Kingdom
- Bornu
- Buganda
- Bunyoro
- Burundi
- Chokwe
- Dahomey
- Empire of Sokoto
- Jumbe
- Karagwe
- Matabele
- Merina
- Mirambo
- Mlozi
- Morocco
- Msiri
- Rwanda
- Samori
- (Mahdist State of the) Sudan
- Yao Chiefs
- Yoruba State
- Wadai
- (Sultanate of) Zanzibar
- Zulu Empire

Under colonial rule, the plantation system of farming was widely introduced in order to grow large quantities of cash crops, and employing cheap (often forced) African labor for export to European countries. Mining for gems and precious metals such as gold was developed in a similar way by wealthy European entrepreneurs such as Cecil Rhodes. The implementation and effects of these colonial policies could be brutal. One extreme example of exploitation of Africans during this period is the Congo Free State, administered under a form of "company rule". The Belgians, under Leopold II of Belgium, allowed businesses to use forced labour as they saw fit. The brutal conditions, famine and disease ended in the deaths of an estimated 10 million Congolese between 1885 and 1908.

Belgian government commissions in the 1920s found that the population of Belgian Congo had fallen by as much as 50% under Congo Free State rule as a result of forced labor (largely for the purposes of rubber cultivation), massacre by colonial troops, famine and disease. In white settler colonies like Algeria, Kenya, Rhodesia (now Zimbabwe), South Africa and Southwest Africa (now Namibia), the most fertile lands were forcibly expropriated from the indigenous populations for use by white settlers. In these countries African farmers were pushed onto "native reserves," usually located on arid, marginal lands. Slavery was also widely abolished by colonial powers.

==== Economics ====
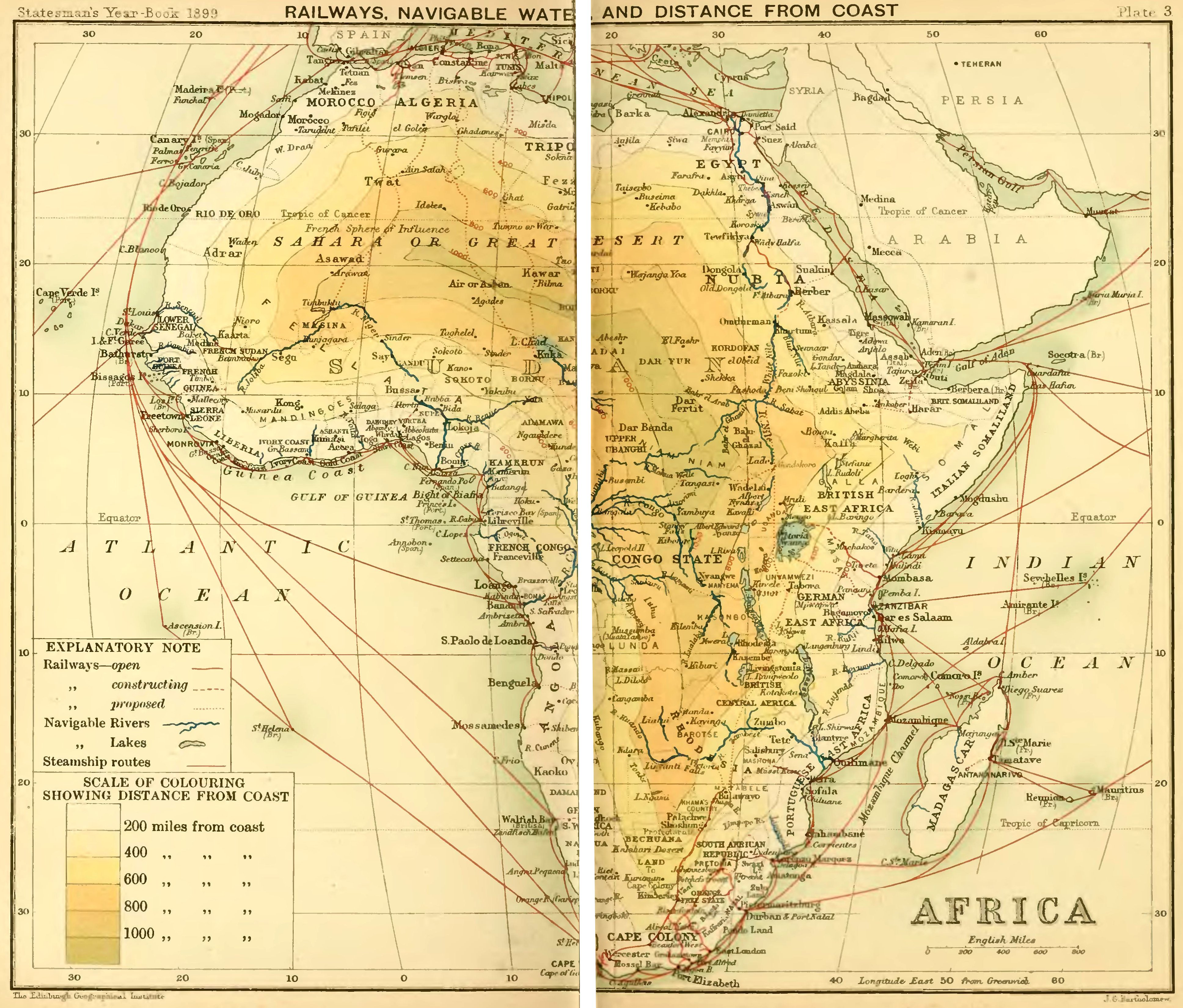
Railway map of Africa, including tracks proposed and under construction, The Statesman's Yearbook, 1899

To some colonizers, such as the British, the ideal colony was based on an open economy, actively engaged in world trade through the export of raw materials and the import of finished goods. The British practiced a policy of light administration, enforcing relatively little regulation on their colonies, especially in non-economic matters. As long as British interests were achieved, native populations were given greater individual freedoms. A great example for this is the British colonial education system. It relied mainly on local resources and languages in education, many missionaries were run by Africans. This resulted in higher numeracy levels in areas that were influenced by British colonial education, and thus an increase in human capital. Other colonizers, such as the French, took a more active approach to governance, encouraging or even requiring their subjects to more fully assimilate into French culture. Many colonial powers centred their education systems around this style of assimilation, focusing their efforts on literary education in an attempt to 'civilise' rather than assist productivity and develop technical skills.

Colonizers were under heavy political pressure to make their colonies immediately and continuously profitable. In almost all cases, this constraint led to a shortage of long-term investment from the mother countries into the economic development in their colonies. While these countries did finance some major infrastructure projects designed to facilitate trade, this was primarily to aid in the immediate extraction of valuable resources, and there was little to no investment into growing local business. Another reason colonial governments allowed local economies to lag behind was that competitive local industries would have reduced the colonies' trade dependence on the central economies in Europe. The aim of colonial economics was often to extract the most value out of the existing natural resources within the territory, rather than creating balanced and sustainable economic models. This meant African colonial economies were often export based, with little to no domestic manufacturing, resulting in the aforementioned trade dependence on Europe.

For the colonies to be integrated into the world economy and imperial trade network, the colonial governments needed the local citizens to engage in market activity, rather than simply subsistence agriculture. One method that colonial powers used to urge the native populations into participating in the larger economy was the requirement that taxes be paid in official currency. This made subsistence farming less feasible, as the producers then needed to sell at least some surplus in the market to obtain the currency needed for the payment of taxes.

Many times colonial powers collected these taxes through the assistance of local African chiefs, who were politically and financially supported by the colonial governments in exchange for their assistance in enforcing these governments' policies, especially for policies that could be unpopular. Thus, the colonizers themselves avoided some degree of animosity from their subjects by using these established chiefs as proxies to enforce many of their coercive policies.

Today, many African economies are affected by the legacy of colonialism. In agriculture, the plantation systems that they introduced were highly unsustainable and caused severe environmental degradation. For example, cotton severely lowers soil fertility wherever it is grown, and areas of West Africa that are dominated by cotton plantations are now unable to switch to more profitable crops or even to produce food because of the depleted soil. Recently, more countries have initiated programs to change to traditional, sustainable forms of agriculture such as shifting cultivation and bush fallow in order to grow enough food to support the population while maintaining soil fertility which allows agriculture to continue in future generations. (Gyasi)

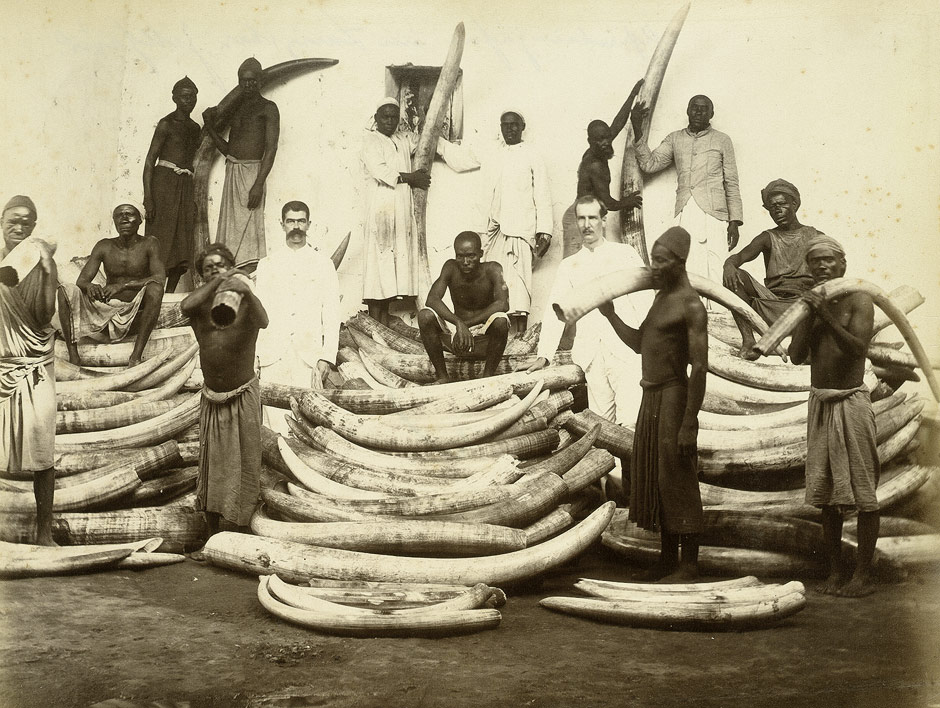
Ivory trade in the African Great Lakes region, 1880s

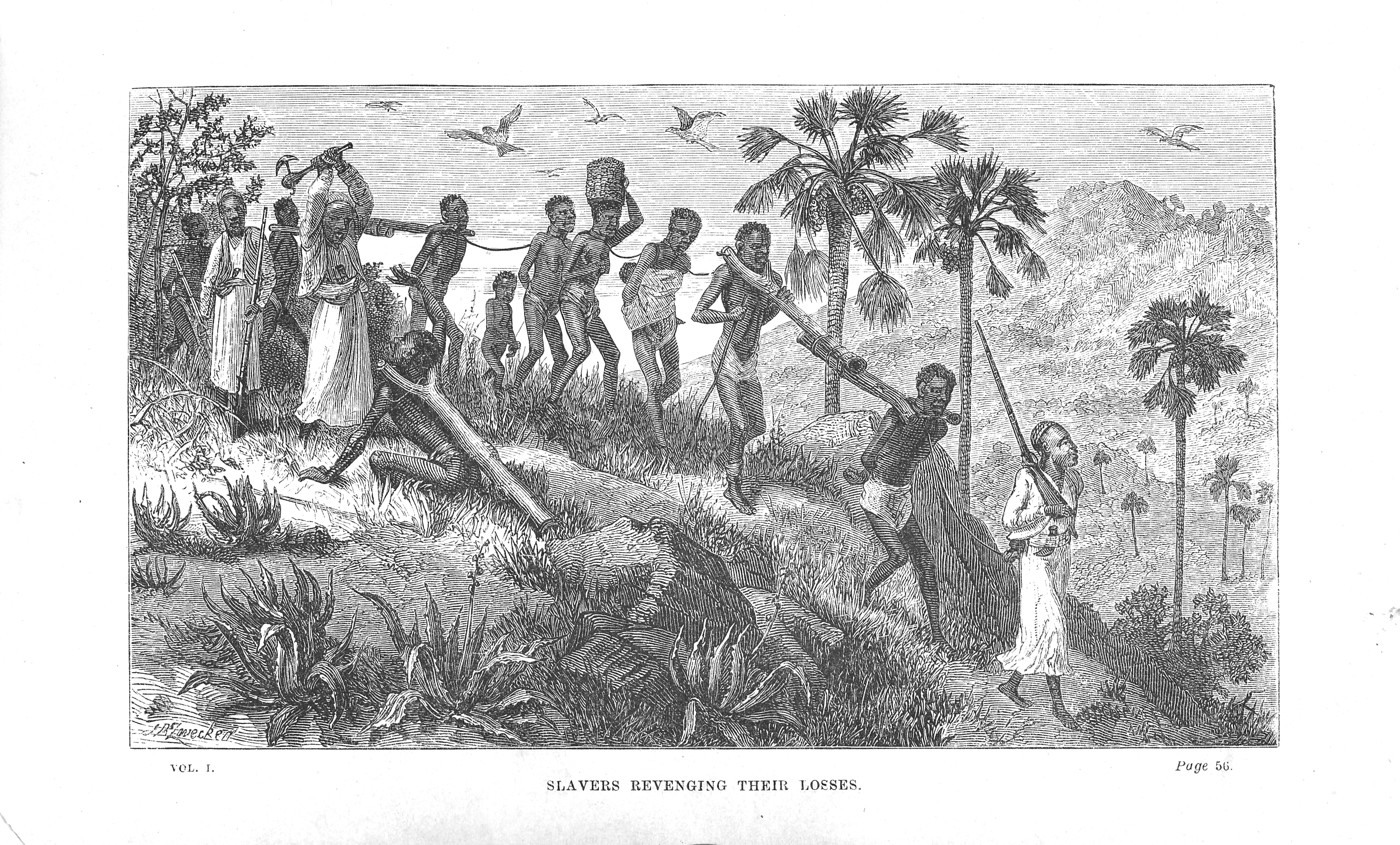
Arab slave traders and their captives near the Ruvuma (Rovuma) river in today's Tanzania and Mozambique, then under Portuguese rule (1866)

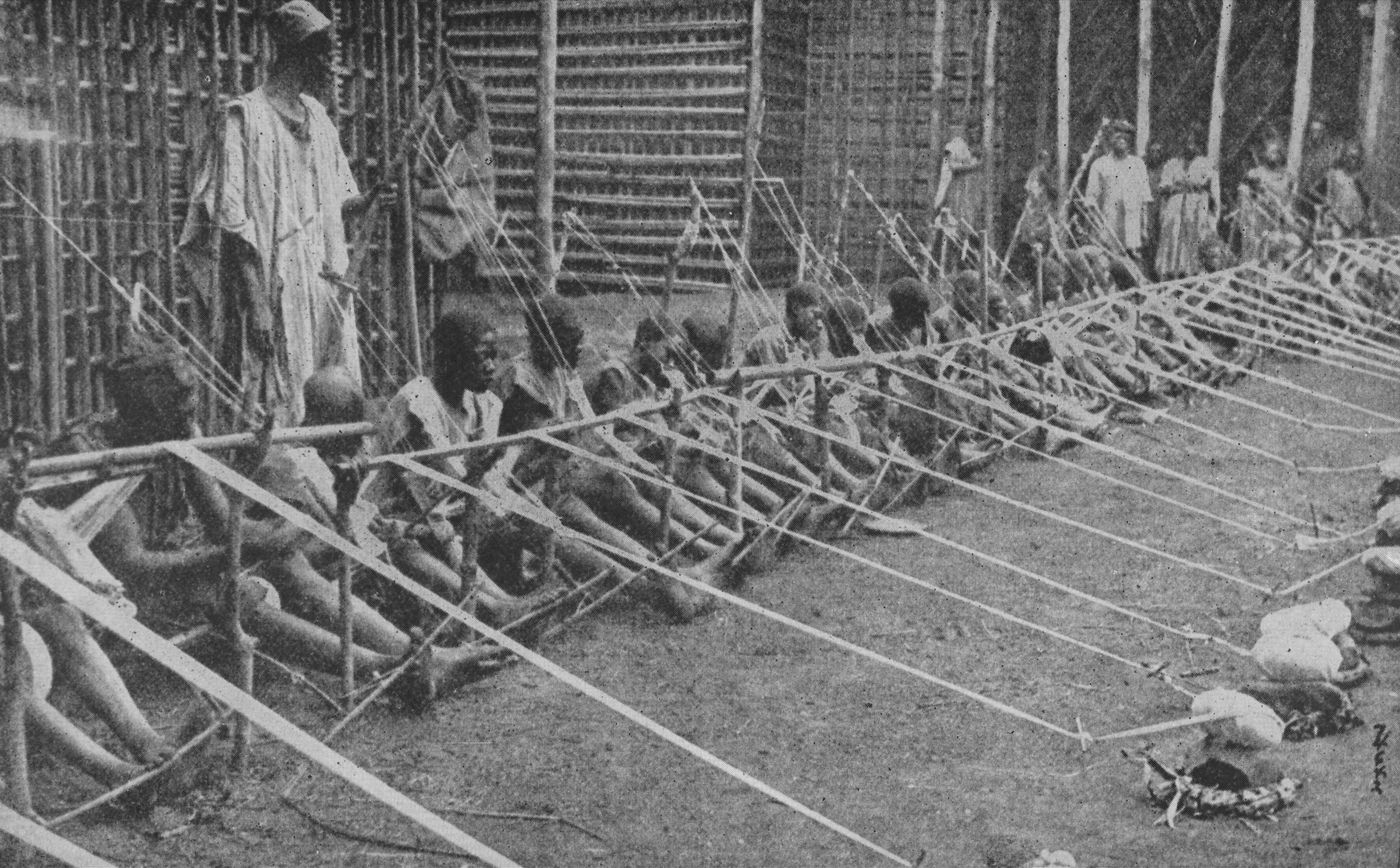
Children in Cameroon weaving, 1919

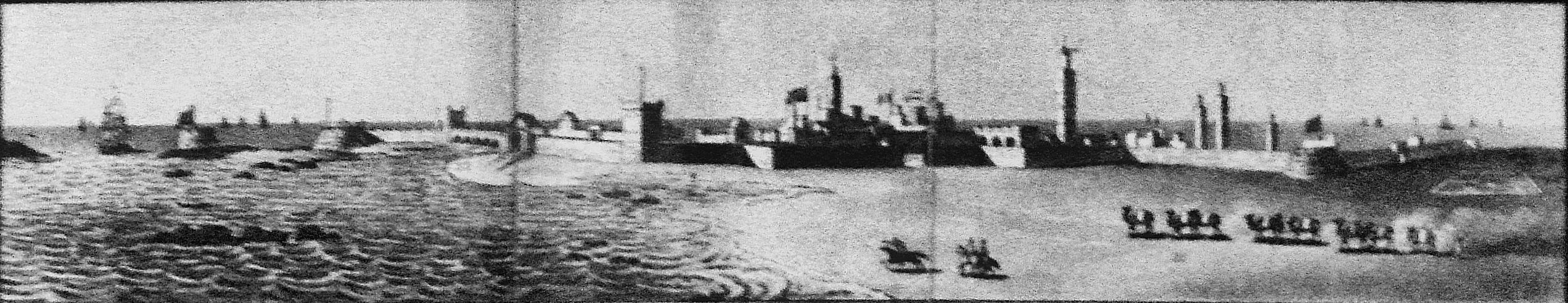
Essaouira in 1809

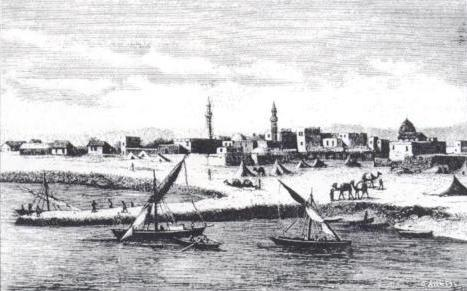
Port of Zeila, 19th century

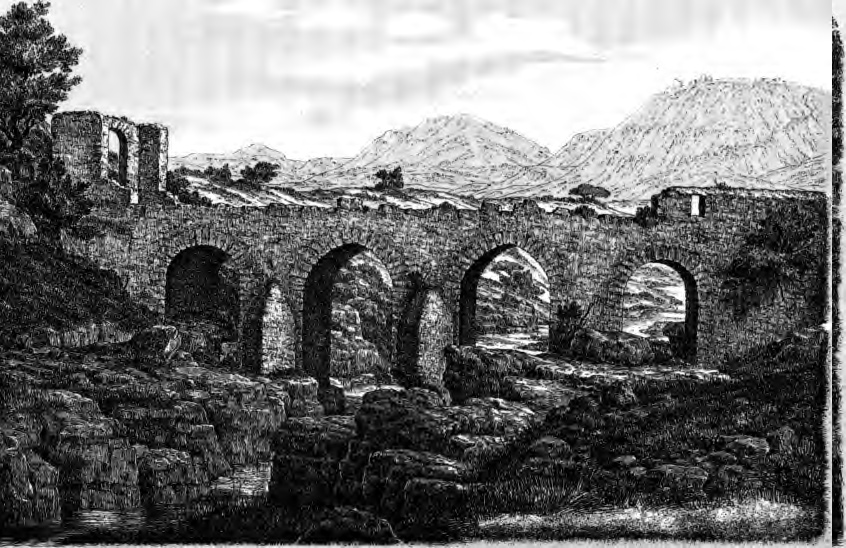
Bridge over the Magech River near Gondar, 1883

== Independence and the Cold War ==
After World War II, European attitudes towards Africa began to change. In the aftermath of World War II and the beginning of the Cold War, 'Western' powers were averse to the idea of using outright conquest to annex territory. At the same time, agitation against colonial rule was becoming persistent in Africa. Between 1945 and 1948 there was a series of strikes and protests, in Senegal, Tanzania, on the French West African railway system, and along West Africa's Gold Coast.

African countries gradually won their independence (with colonial-era boundaries intact), in most cases without prolonged violent conflict (exceptions include the Cameroon, Madagascar and Kenya). As the Cold War continued, African governments could count on support from either Western governments or Communist patrons, depending upon their ideology.

The early years of independence went relatively smoothly for most African countries. This economic resilience eroded for the most part over the next several decades. Many arguments have been made to identify factors to explain the economic decline of many African countries. The tendency towards single-party rule, outlawing political opposition, had the result of keeping dictators in power for many years, perpetuating failed policies. Loans from foreign governments became crippling burdens to some countries that had difficulty even paying the interest on the loans. The UN Conference on Trade and Development (UNCTAD) estimates that between 1970 and 2002 "sub-Saharan Africa received $294 billion in loans, paid out $268 billion in debt service, and yet still owes $300 billion".

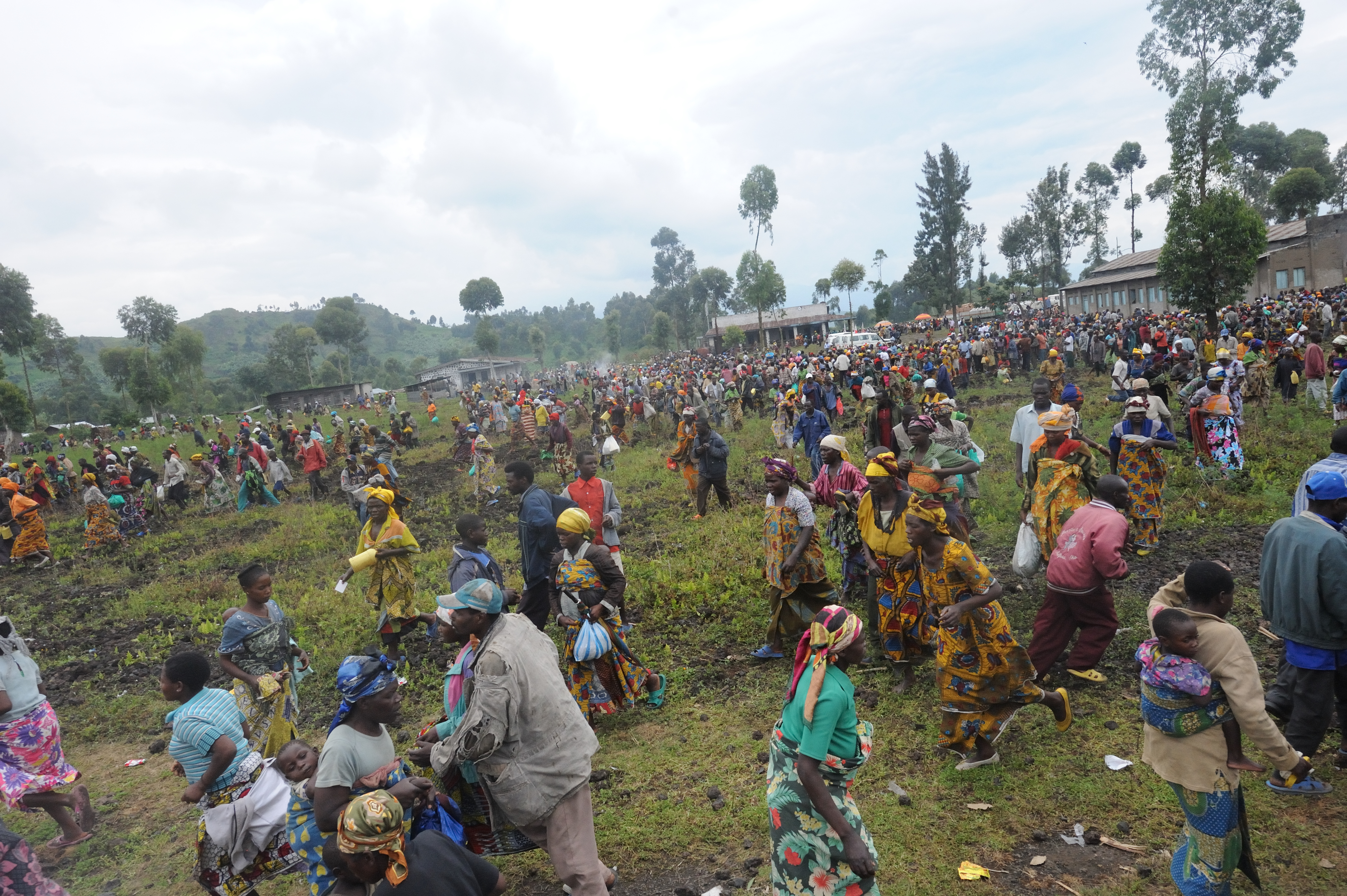
Conflicts such as the Second Congo War, which alone killed an estimated 2.7–5.4 million people, have set African economies back.

At various points during the late 20th century, the following debts were incurred by African governments (amounts are in billions of US dollars):

- Nigeria (33)
- South Africa (22)
- Democratic Republic of the Congo (13)
- Sudan (9)
- Ethiopia (8)

By the 1980s, political conflict had erupted into civil war in some countries, and the political instability kept some economies mired for many years. Some African governments faced practical problems in implementing industrial change as they attempted rapid modernization of their economies; costing and mismanagement problems in agricultural, manufacturing, and other sectors meant the failure of many projects. One result was African countries becoming increasingly dependent upon foreign food imports.

A heavy blow to the economies of many African countries came from the 1973 OPEC oil embargo. Arab OPEC member countries opposed Israel during the Yom Kippur War of October 1973. OPEC embargoed oil exports to many Western governments as retaliation for their having supported Israel in the War. 40 African countries were dependent upon oil imports from OPEC, and when the price of oil rose rapidly from the embargo, African exports became too expensive for many foreign markets.

== Poverty ==
A major question in the economic history of Africa is focusing on explanations for the relative poverty of the continent. Economists today use different ways to explain this phenomenon usually either an external or internal approach.

External approach

External approaches usually focus on institutional patterns within economies. They try to explain Africa's economic development as subject to European institutional decisions of the past. European colonial governments had no incentive to create institutions fostering economic development in African colonies, but rather economic extraction of given resources. Even today, African institutions still depend on these early decisions. For example, in Africa, property rights are not established or enforced in a way promoting economic activity, and many African nations still rely heavily on raw material exports for income. For instance, in 2008, 75% of Malian exports came from gold.

Internal approach

Here two distinct ways have to be differentiated: The first one, similar to the external approach, focuses on property right distributions in Africa. These usually emerge from the setup of the society, being more collective than individualist with tribes or families playing an important role in Africa. Thereby the distribution of property rights is an obstacle to economic development. Also, there are few incentives to change this setup into an economically more advantageous setting. For rulers it is often the rational choice to stick to this property rights setup, thereby being able to extract more from their dominion than by fostering economic development. The second internal approach focuses directly on resource endowments within the specific regions. Labor scarcity until the 20th century combined with a relatively low quality of soils lead to an extensive way of farming, largely relying on vast amounts of land rather than on intensive use of labor on the land. Combined with bad institutions from precolonial or colonial times this economic setup hinders the extensive use of technology and thereby slowing down or even preventing economic development.

== Modern era ==
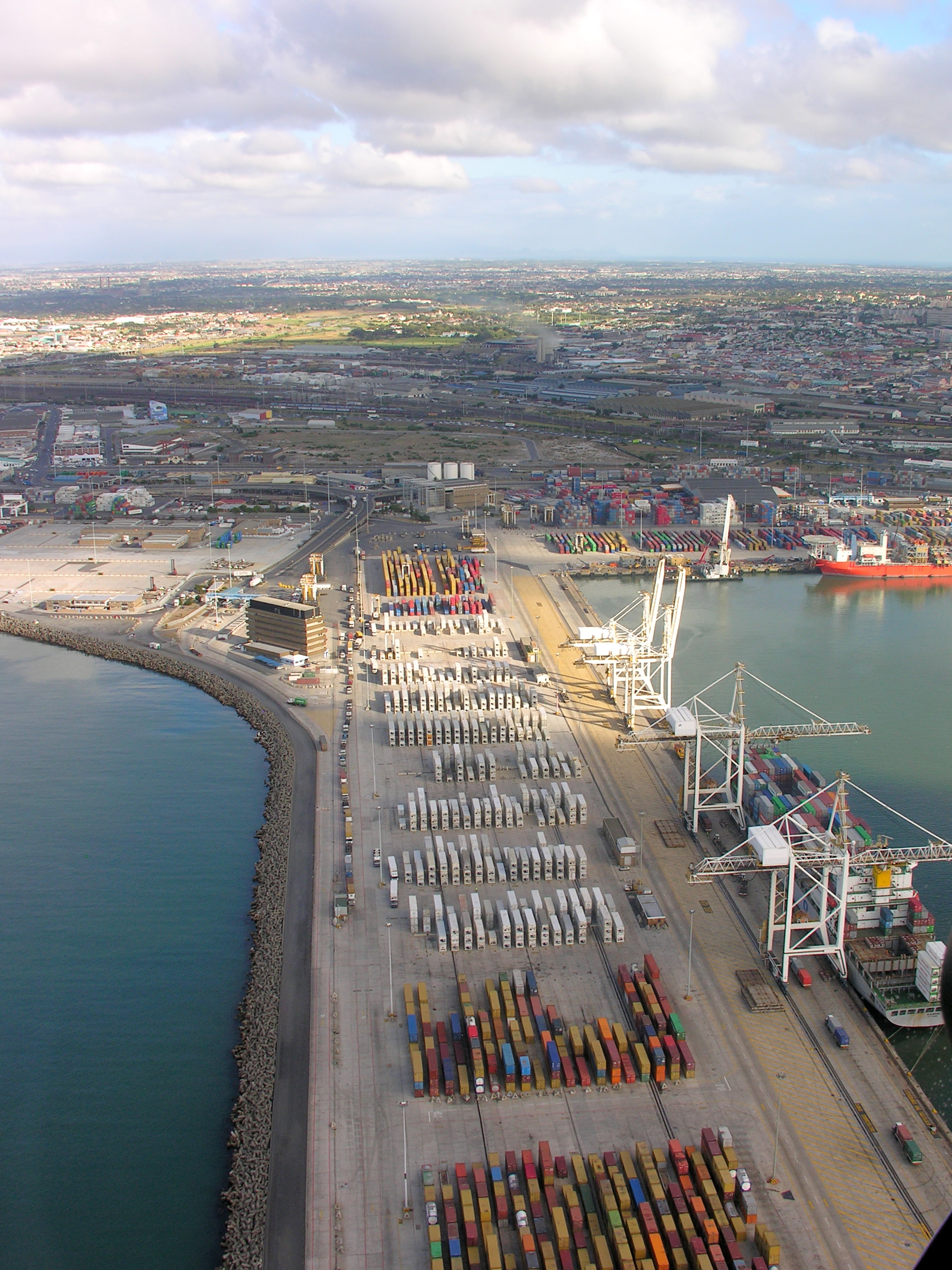
Port of Cape Town, South Africa

The wealthy elite in Africa in the late 20th century was characterized by civil servants functioning as "gatekeepers", holding positions with authority to approve foreign aid, humanitarian assistance, and private investment (typically foreign). Bribery and corruption became entrenched in some countries. Environmental and political catastrophe combined in several famines during the 1970s and 1980s in Ethiopia, Mali, Mauritania and Mozambique. The impact of drought and desertification of a large part of the continent came to widespread public attention by the early 21st century.

Railway projects were important in mining districts from the late 19th century. Large railway and road projects characterize the late 19th century. Railroads were emphasized in the colonial era, and roads in 'post-colonial' times. Jedwab & Storeygard find that in 1960–2015 there were strong correlations between transportation investments and economic development. Influential political include pre-colonial centralization, ethnic fractionalization, European settlement, natural resource dependence, and democracy.

Africa's economy only began to take off in the early 2000s as the political situation improved, national governments began to crack down on corruption and patronage, macroeconomic growth plans aimed at improving living conditions began to be implemented, and millions of Africans continued to flock to the cities in search of jobs and other amenities.

== See also ==
- Economy of Africa

General:

- History of Africa
- African historiography
