= Himadri =

Himadri may refer to:

- Great Himalayas, one of the ranges of the Himalayas
- Himadri (research station), Indian research station in the Arctic

== See also ==
- Himalaya (disambiguation)
- HIMADRI, the Himalayan Alpine Dynamics Research Initiative
