= Himalaya (disambiguation) =

The Himalayas or Himalaya are a mountain range in Asia.

Himalaya may also refer to:

== People ==
- Andy Himalaya (born 1959), Mexican Alpine skier
- Prince Himalaya of Nepal (1921–1980)

== Entertainment ==
- Himalaya (book), a 2004 travel book
- Himalaya (film), a 1999 Nepalese film
- Himalaya: Ladder to Paradise, a 2015 Chinese documentary film
- Himalayas (band), Welsh rock group
- The Himalayas (film), a 2015 film
- Himalaya with Michael Palin, a 2004 BBC television series
- Himalaya (ride), an amusement ride
- "Himalaya", a 1972 song by C. Jérôme
- "Himalaya", a 2003 song by Jeanette from Break On Through
- "Himalaya", a 2020 song by New Found Glory from Forever + Ever x Infinity
- "Himalayas", a 2015 song by Chief Keef from Sorry 4 the Weight
- Himalaya FM, whose Chinese version is Ximalaya FM (Chinese: 喜马拉雅FM), an audio sharing platform from China

== Ships ==
- HMS Himalaya, ships of the Royal Navy
- SS Himalaya, steamships with the name

== Other uses ==
- Himalaya Kingdom, a mythological mountainous country
- Himalaya clause, a contractual provision expressed to be for the benefit of a third party who is not a party to the contract
- Himalaya Studios, a computer game developer
- Himalaya Wellness Company, an ayurvedic drug company

== See also ==
- Himalayan (disambiguation)
- Himalia (disambiguation)
- Himadri (disambiguation)
- Hima (disambiguation)
- Alay (disambiguation)
