= Himalia =

Himalia may refer to:

- Himalia (moon), a moon of Jupiter
  - Himalia group
- Himalia (mythology), a nymph from Cyprus in Greek mythology
- Himalia Ridge, a ridge on the Ganymede Heights massif on Alexander Island, Antarctica
- Himalia (film), a 2024 Canadian short film directed by Clara Milo and Juliette Lossky

== See also ==
- Himalaya (disambiguation)
