= Slangkop Lighthouse =

Lighthouse in South Africa

Slangkop Lighthouse Slangkoppunt
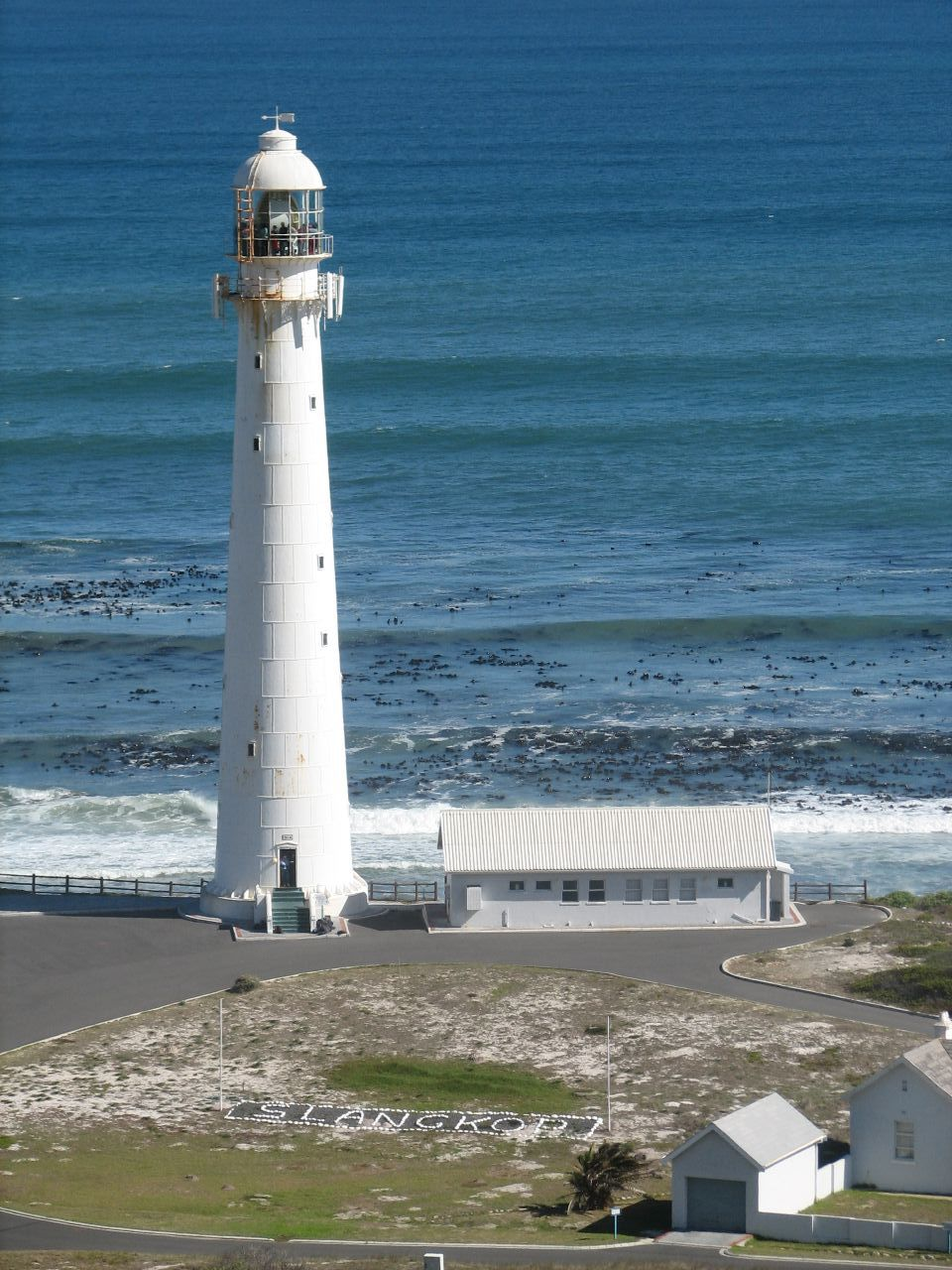
- Location: Kommetjie; Western Cape; South Africa
- Coordinates: 34°08′55.0″S 18°19′10.0″E

Tower
- Constructed: 1919
- Construction: cast iron tower
- Height: 33 metres (108 ft)
- Shape: tapered cylindrical tower with balcony and lantern
- Markings: white tower and lantern

Light
- First lit: 4 March 1919
- Focal height: 40 metres (130 ft)
- Intensity: 5,000,000 CD
- Range: 33 miles (53 km)
- Characteristic: Fl (4) W 30s.

Slangkop Lighthouse is a lighthouse near the town of Kommetjie, near Cape Town, South Africa.

== History ==
Construction was due to be completed in 1914 and a brass sign was commissioned for this date, but due to the First World War the lighthouse was not completed until 1919, although definitely in use before that date, e.g. noted in the log of HMS Himalaya on 19 July 1917. The lighthouse was inaugurated on 4 March 1919. The white circular iron tower stands 33m high.

The lighthouse is a tourist attraction. The lighthouse appears in the Steven Seagal movie Mercenary for Justice.

== Gallery ==
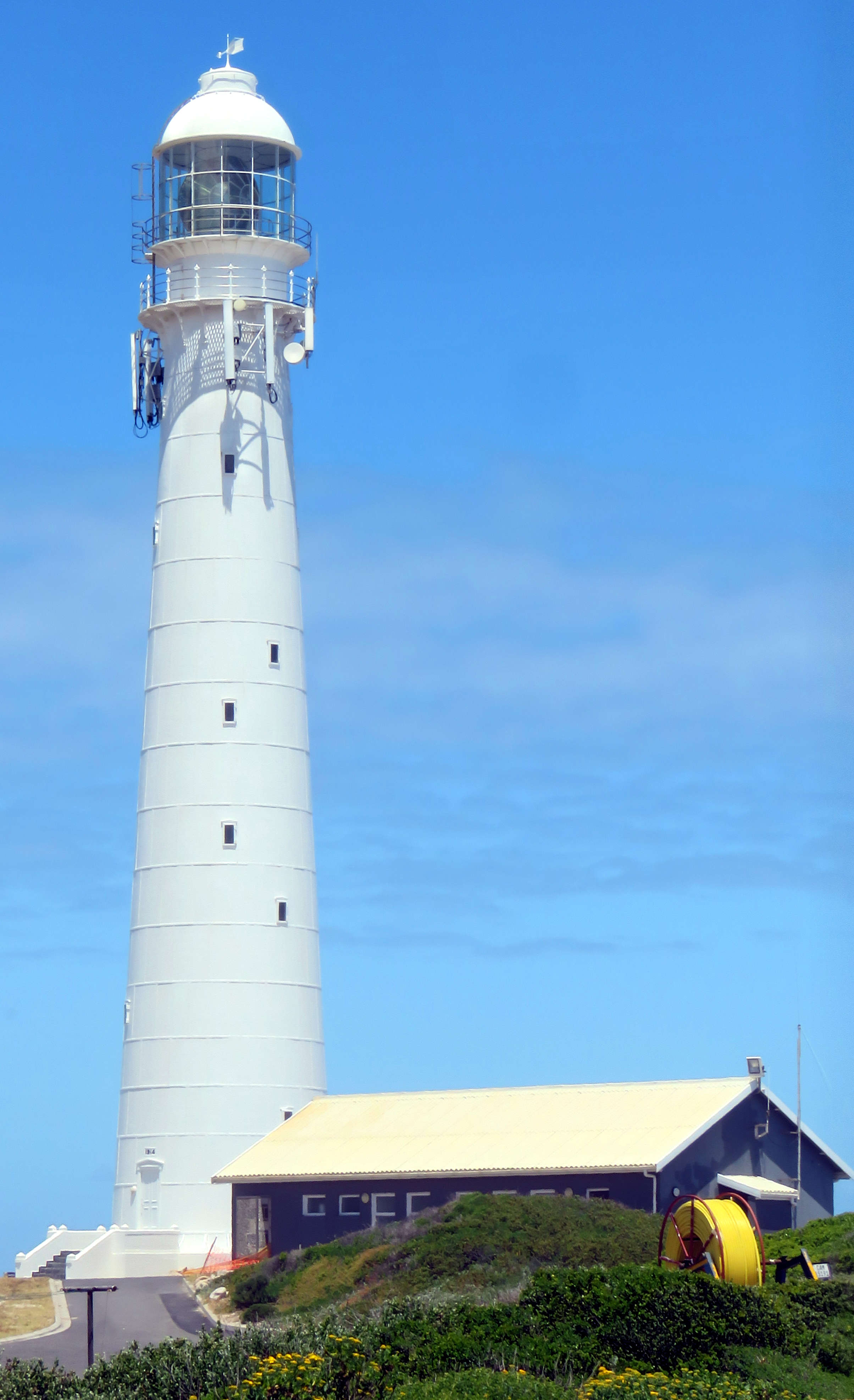
Slangkop Lighthouse

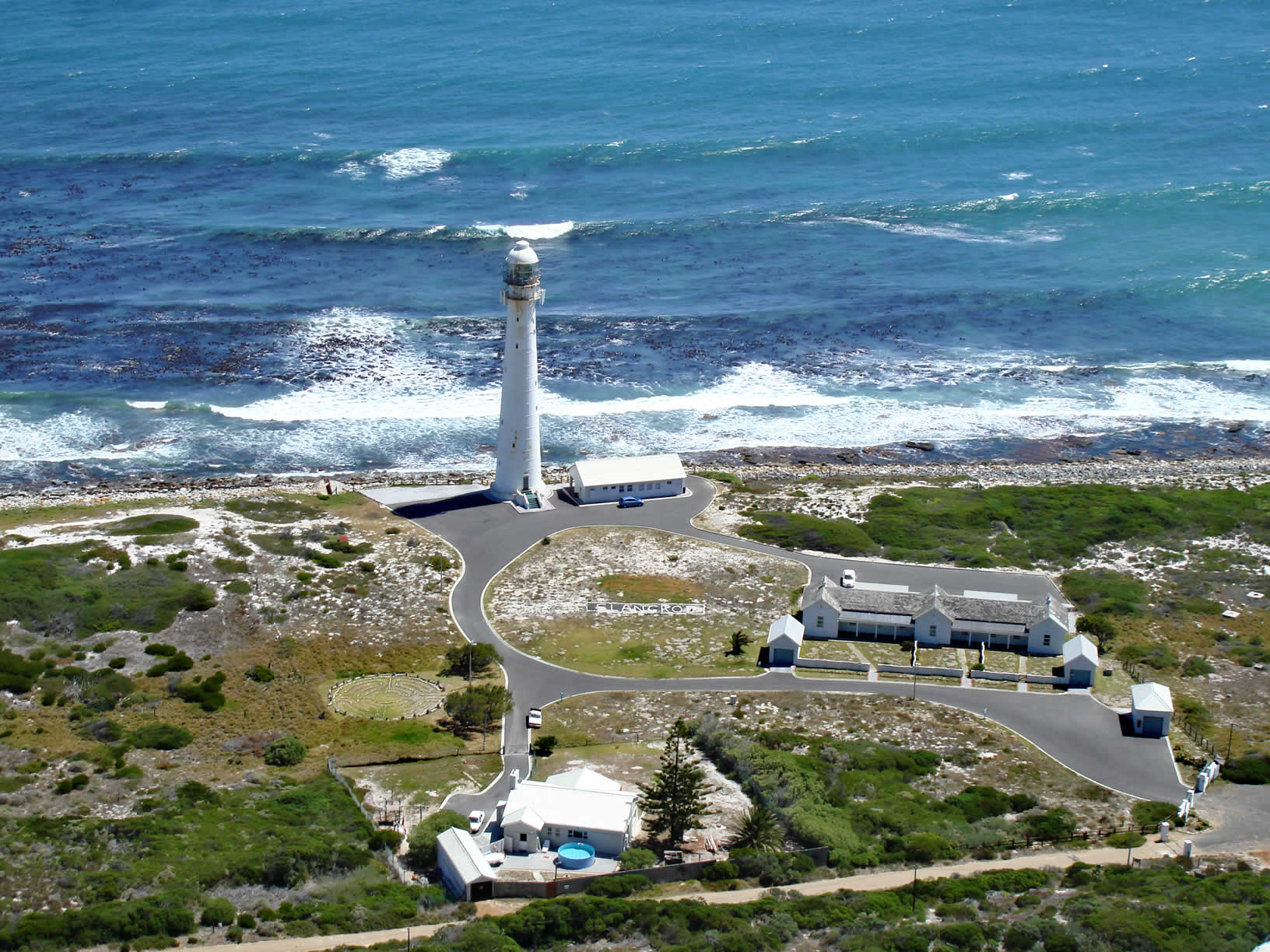

== See also ==
- List of lighthouses in South Africa
- List of heritage sites in South Africa
