= Himalayan =

Himalayan may refer to:

- Himalayas mountain range
  - Transhimalaya, a subrange (some species found there are referred to as "Himalayan" not "Transhimalayan")
- Himalayan (album), an album by the band Band of Skulls
- Himalayan cat, a breed of domesticated cat
- Himalayan guinea pig, a coloration pattern in the domesticated guinea pig (cavy)
- Himalayan rabbit, a breed of rabbit
- Royal Enfield Himalayan, an adventure touring motorcycle
- The Himalayans (American band)
- The Himalayans (Nepali band), a Nepali band in Hong Kong
- Rubus armeniacus, common name 'Himalayan blackberry'

== See also ==
- Himalaya (disambiguation)
