= Himalayan Alpine Dynamics Research Initiative =

The Himalayan Alpine Dynamics Research Initiative (HIMADRI) involves a set of pristine sites set aside and monitored to observe the migration of plant species due to climate change. Established in 2013, the program has taken care of the gap in Indian Himalaya monitoring.

== History ==
The idea to monitor alpine plant communities was first discussed in 1996 during a workshop in Kathmandu. Scientists began running experiments in alpine habitats to determine what a good sample method might be. In 2001, GLORIA-Europe was launched. This initial project, with 18 sites in 13 different European nations, was a way to test out the idea before going worldwide. Since the spring of 2004, GLORIA has been expanding into other regions of the world. However, the Indian Himalaya remained a gap which is being filled through HIMADRI network.

== See also ==
- Effects of global warming
