= Himalaya: Ladder to Paradise =

- Poster
- 喜马拉雅天梯
- Directed by: Han Xiao; Junjian Liang
- Starring: Suo Langduoji; Pu Budunzhu; Ge Sangyingzong; Ci Renduobujie; Jia Bu
- Release date: 16 October 2015
- Running time: 89 minutes
- Country: China
- Languages: Mandarin; Tibetan
- Box office: CN¥0.5 million

Himalaya: Ladder to Paradise (Chinese: 喜马拉雅天梯) is a 2015 Chinese documentary film directed by Han Xiao and Junjian Liang. The film was released on 16 October 2015.

== Cast ==
- Suo Langduoji
- Pu Budunzhu
- Ge Sangyingzong
- Ci Renduobujie
- Jia Bu

== Reception ==
The film has earned CN¥0.545 million at the Chinese box office.
