= Johann Jacob Reichard =

German physician and botanist (1743–1782)

Johann Jacob Reichard (7 August 1743 in Frankfurt – 21 January 1782 in Frankfurt) was a German physician and botanist.

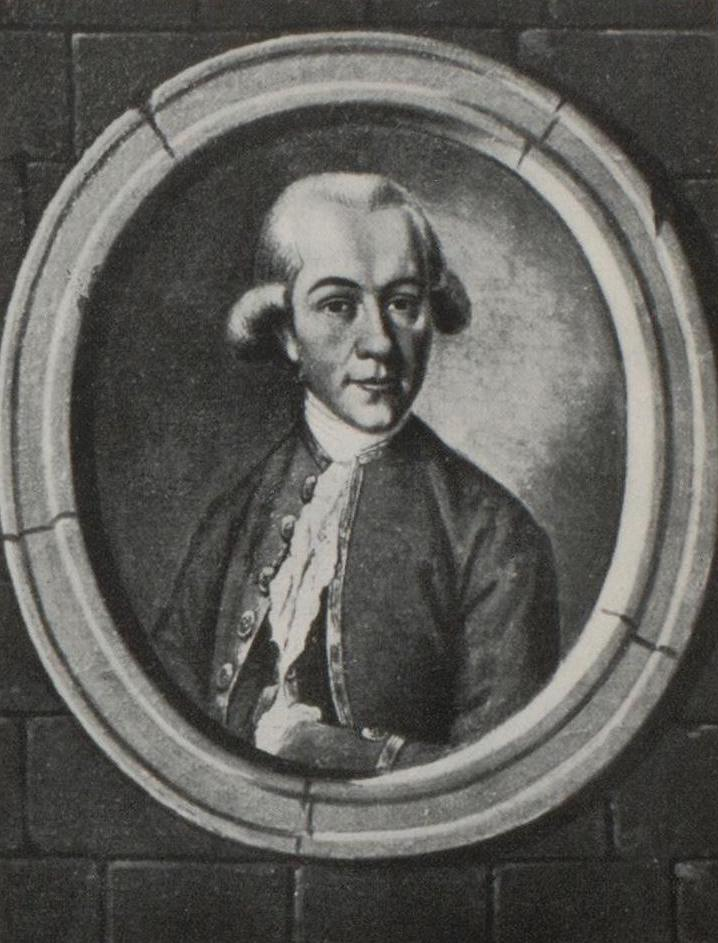
Portrait of Johann Jacob Reichard

He studied medicine, philosophy and natural sciences at the University of Göttingen, receiving his doctorate in 1768. While working as a physician in his hometown, he carried out investigations of flora native to the Frankfurt am Main area, publishing Flora Moeno-Francofurtana (2 volumes, 1772–78) as a result. Beginning in 1773, he served as chief physician at the Senckenburg Foundation, in which capacity, he was in charge of its library, botanical gardens and chemistry laboratory. From 1779 he worked as a physician at the Bürgerhospital in Frankfurt.

In 1775 he became a member of the Academy of Sciences Leopoldina. In 1780 he was founding editor of the periodical, Medizinisches Wochenblatt für Aerzte, Wundārzte und Apotheker. The plant genus Reichardia (family Asteraceae) was named in his honor by Albrecht Wilhelm Roth.
