= Seedies and Kroomen =

African sailors in the British navy

Kroo-boys

Seedies and Kroomen (also Kroumen or Krumen) were African sailors recruited locally into the British Royal Navy in the 19th and early 20th century.

The Seedies − from the Hindi word sidi − were mostly employed in less skilled jobs. They were Muslim, and the navy recruited them from ports on the Indian Ocean, primarily from Zanzibar and the Seychelles. Some seem to have been ex-slaves. One example of a Royal Navy ship of the line they served on was HMS London, which between 1878 and 1883 was stationed in Zanzibar bay where she helped suppress the slave trade. A later example is the armed merchant cruiser HMS Himalaya, aboard whom seedies served from 1916 until 1918.

The Kroomen were experienced fishermen from the Kroo or Kru tribe in Sotta Krou, in what is now Liberia in West Africa. Because of their knowledge of the west African coast they were sometimes employed as pilots.

Horatio Bridge, a United States Navy officer in the 1840s, described them as follows:

The Kroomen are indispensable in carrying on the commerce and maritime business of the African coast. When a Kroo-boat comes alongside, you may buy the canoe, hire the men at a moment's warning, and retain them in your service for months. They expend no time nor trouble in providing their equipment, since it consists merely of a straw hat and a piece of white or colored cotton girded about their loins.

In their canoes, they deposit these girdles in the crowns of their hats; nor is it unusual, when a shower threatens them on shore, to see them place this sole garment in the same convenient receptacle, and then make for shelter. When rowing a boat, or paddling a canoe, it is their custom to sing; and, as the music goes on, they seem to become invigorated, applying their strength cheerfully, and with limbs as unwearied as their voices. One of their number leads in recitative, and the whole company respond in the chorus. The subject of the song is a recital of the exploits of the men, their employments, their intended movements, the news of the coast, and the character of their employers. It is usual, in these extemporary strains, for the Kroomen attached to a man-of-war to taunt, with good-humored satire, their friends who are more laboriously employed in merchant vessels, and not so well fed and paid.

Their object in leaving home, and entering into the service of navigators, is generally to obtain the means of purchasing wives, the number of whom constitutes a man's importance. The sons of "gentlemen" (for there is such a distinction of rank among them) never labour at home, but do not hesitate to go away, for a year or two, and earn something to take to their families. On the return of these wanderers—not like the prodigal son, but bringing wealth to their kindred—great rejoicings are instituted. A bullock is killed by the head of the family, guns are fired, and two or three days are spent in the performance of various plays and dances. The "boy" gives all his earnings to his father, and places himself again under the parental authority. The Krooman of maturer age, on his return from an expedition of this kind, buys a wife, or perhaps more than one, and distributes the rest of his accumulated gains among his relatives. In a week, he has nothing left but his wives and his house."

Seedies and Kroomen normally served on three-year contracts. When released from their contract many of these people settled in various parts of the British Empire.

George Bernard Shaw's play Captain Brassbound's Conversion includes extras playing "Krooboys" in a ship's crew.
