= SS Himalaya (1892) =

P&O steam ocean liner

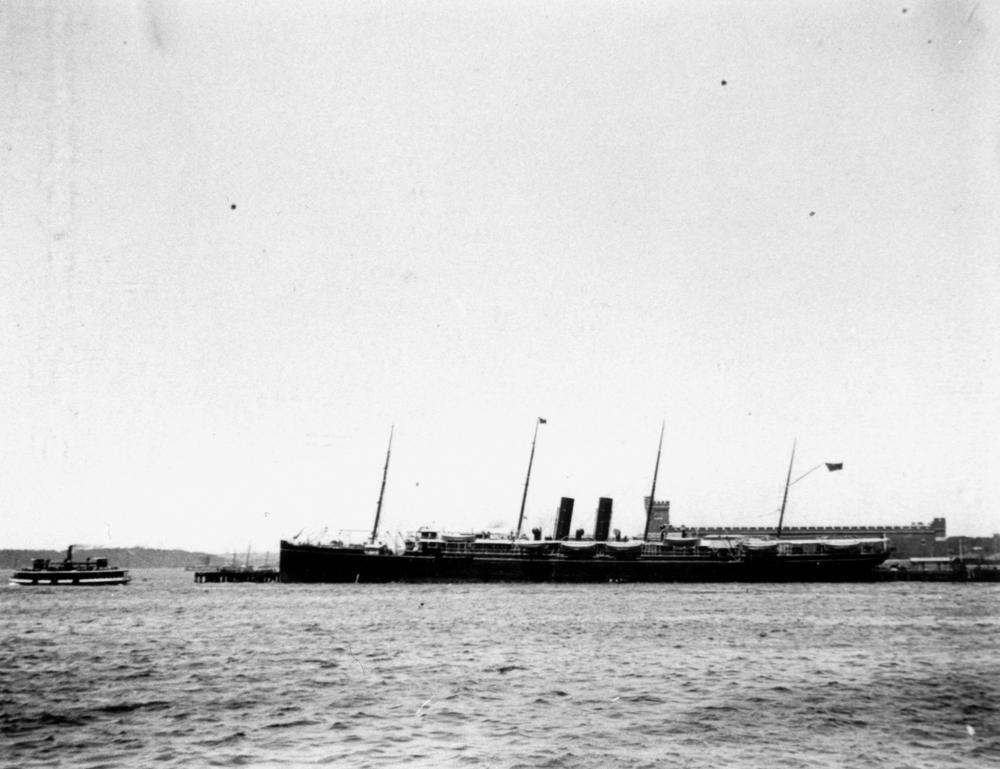
- Himalaya in 1902

History

United Kingdom
- Name: Himalaya
- Namesake: Himalayas
- Owner: 1892: P&O SN Co; 1916: Admiralty; 1919: P&O SN Co; 1922: Board of Trade
- Operator: 1892: P&O; 1914: (United Kingdom) Royal Navy
- Port of registry: 1902: (United Kingdom) Greenock; 1914: (United Kingdom)
- Route: 1893: Tilbury – Suez Canal – Sydney; 1908: Britain – Japan
- Builder: Caird & Company, Greenock
- Yard number: 266
- Launched: 27 February 1892
- Completed: 24 June 1892
- Acquired: by Admiralty, 21 June 1916
- Commissioned: by Admiralty, August 1914
- Recommissioned: by Admiralty, 11 April 1916
- Decommissioned: by Admiralty, 16 June 1918
- Maiden voyage: Tilbury – Bombay, Nov–Dec 1892
- Identification: UK official number 99776; code letters MQDN; by 1913: call sign MNY; 1914: Pennant number M.67
- Fate: Scrapped 1922

General characteristics
- Type: Ocean liner
- Tonnage: 6,929 GRT, 3,706 NRT
- Length: 465.6 ft (141.9 m)
- Beam: 52.2 ft (15.9 m)
- Depth: 26.4 ft (8.0 m)
- Decks: 2
- Installed power: 1,356 NHP, 10,000 IHP
- Propulsion: 1 × triple expansion engine; 1 × screw
- Speed: 17 1/2 knots (32.4 km/h)
- Capacity: 1892: 265 1st class; 144 2nd class
- Crew: 249
- Armament: 1914: 8 × QF 4.7 inch guns; from 1916: QF 6-inch naval guns; plus machine guns; by 1917: .303 calibre machine guns; 1917: as above plus; 2 × 6-pounder guns; by 1918: .45 calibre as well as .303 machine guns; 1918: BL 6-inch gun replaced one 6-inch naval gun
- Aircraft carried: 1916: 1 × seaplane
- Notes: sister ships: Victoria, Britannia, Oceana, Arcadia, Australia

SS Himalaya was a P&O steam ocean liner that was built in Scotland in 1892 and scrapped in Germany in 1922. She operated scheduled services between England and Australia until 1908, and then to and from Japan until 1914.

Although built as a civilian ship, Himalaya was designed to be suitable for conversion to an auxiliary cruiser if required. In the First World War she served as a Royal Navy armed merchant cruiser from 1914, and was equipped with a seaplane from 1916.

This was the second P&O liner to be called Himalaya. The first Himalaya was completed in 1854, spent most of her career in the Royal Navy as a troop ship and then a coal hulk, and was sunk by enemy action in 1940. The third Himalaya was completed in 1949 and scrapped in 1975.

== "Jubilee boats" ==
In 1887 Caird & Company at Greenock on the Firth of Clyde built a pair of liners for P&O, Victoria and Britannia. They were sometimes called the "Jubilee boats" because 1887 was the Golden Jubilee of Queen Victoria.

In the same year Harland & Wolff in Belfast launched two sister ships of the same class, Oceana and Arcadia, that were completed in 1888. The "Jubilee boats" from Harland & Wolff had the same beam as those from Caird, but were 3 ft (0.9 m) longer and their steam engines were rated at 883 rather than 849 NHP.

Caird built two more ships to an improved version of the same design in 1892. Himalaya and Australia had the same length and beam, but a more powerful engine and better passenger accommodation. Himalaya and Australia were yard numbers 266 and 267. Himalaya was launched on 27 February 1892 and completed on 24 June. Australia was launched on 29 July 1892 and completed on 31 October.

== Details ==
Himalaya's registered length was 465.6 ft (141.9 m), her beam was 52.2 ft (15.9 m) and her depth was 26.4 ft (8.0 m). Her tonnages were 6,929 GRT and 3,706 NRT. Himalaya and Australia were built to Admiralty requirements, with watertight bulkheads for which the UK Government paid an ongoing subsidy of £3,375 a year, to make them suitable to be requisitioned as auxiliary cruisers if required. Each ship had a single screw, driven by a three-cylinder triple expansion engine rated at 1,356 NHP or 10,000 IHP and giving a cruising speed of 17 1/2 knots (32.4 km/h). Steam was raised in three double-ended and three single-ended boilers. Each ship had two funnels and four masts.

Himalaya was built with berths for 265 first class and 144 second class passengers. Her complement was 249 officers and men, of whom 84 were white and 165 were Lascars. Her holds had capacity for 147,537 cubic feet (4,178 m^{3}) of cargo, including refrigerated space for perishable goods.

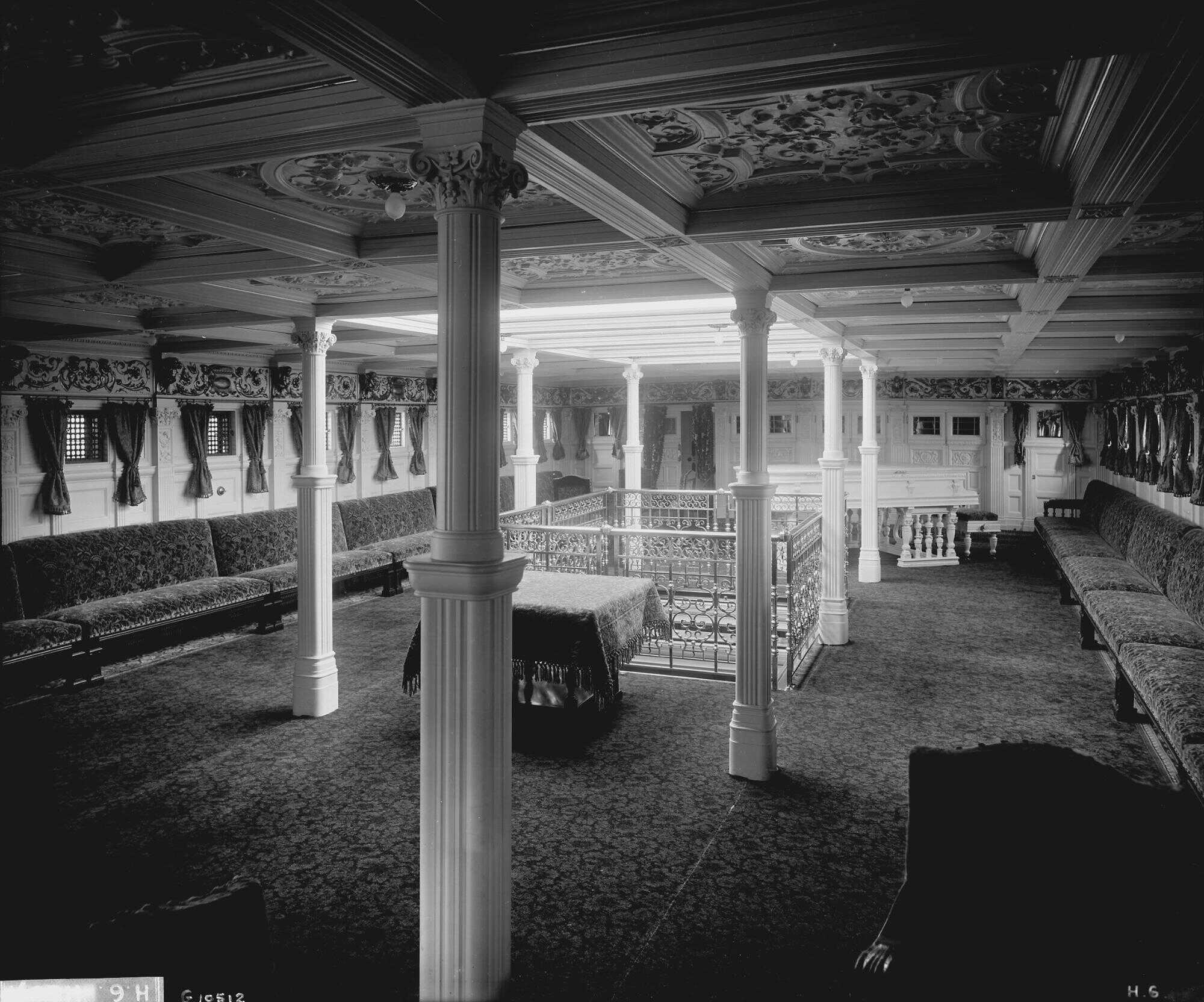
Himalaya's music room, designed by Thomas Collcutt and photographed by Bedford Lemere

The architect Thomas Collcutt designed Himalaya's public rooms. He designed her music room in neoclassical style, with slim columns with Composite capitals. Her main dining saloon was 60 ft (18 m) long, extended the entire width of the ship, and could seat 206 diners.

P&O registered Himalaya at Greenock. Her UK official number was 99776 and her code letters were MQDN. By 1913 she was equipped for wireless telegraphy. Her wireless call sign was MNY.

== First voyages ==
On 30 July 1892 Himalaya began a trial voyage across the English Channel from Tilbury to Cherbourg, carrying 150 guests. On the crossing she was reported to have averaged a speed of 19 knots (35 km/h). She made her return crossing via Cowes for the annual sailing regatta, and then returned to Tilbury.

On 10 October 1892 Himalaya began her maiden voyage via the Suez Canal to India. She was delayed by quarantine regulations in Egypt, and by her engine breaking down six times in the voyage. She reached Bombay early in November, 13 days after leaving England. Despite the delays, her voyage set a new record. Himalaya then returned from Bombay via Brindisi in Italy to Tilbury, again setting a record of 13 1/2 days.

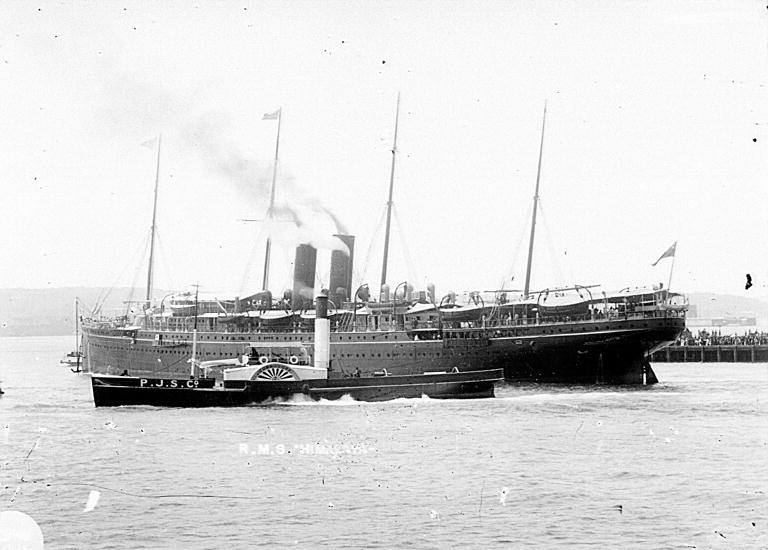
Himalaya in Sydney Harbour, with a paddle ferry passing her in the foreground

In January 1893 Himalaya made her first voyage from England to Australia. She left Tilbury on 6 January, sailed via Gibraltar, Malta, Suez Canal, Aden and Colombo. She reached Albany, Western Australia on 7 February, then called at Adelaide and Melbourne, and reached Sydney on 16 February.

On her return voyage Himalaya left Sydney on 4 March 1893. She called at Hobart in Tasmania, and then at Melbourne, Port Adelaide and Albany, before continuing her voyage to England. At Melbourne she embarked a team of 14 officers and men from Sir William Clarke's a battery of the Victorian Horse Artillery, which was to take part in the Royal Tournament at Islington in London and mounted shooting events at Bisley in Surrey. Also on Himalaya's first voyage from Australia to England was a cricket team to represent Australia in a match against the Earl of Sheffield's England team at Sheffield Park in East Sussex. In England, Himalaya called at Plymouth on 20 April before continuing to Tilbury.

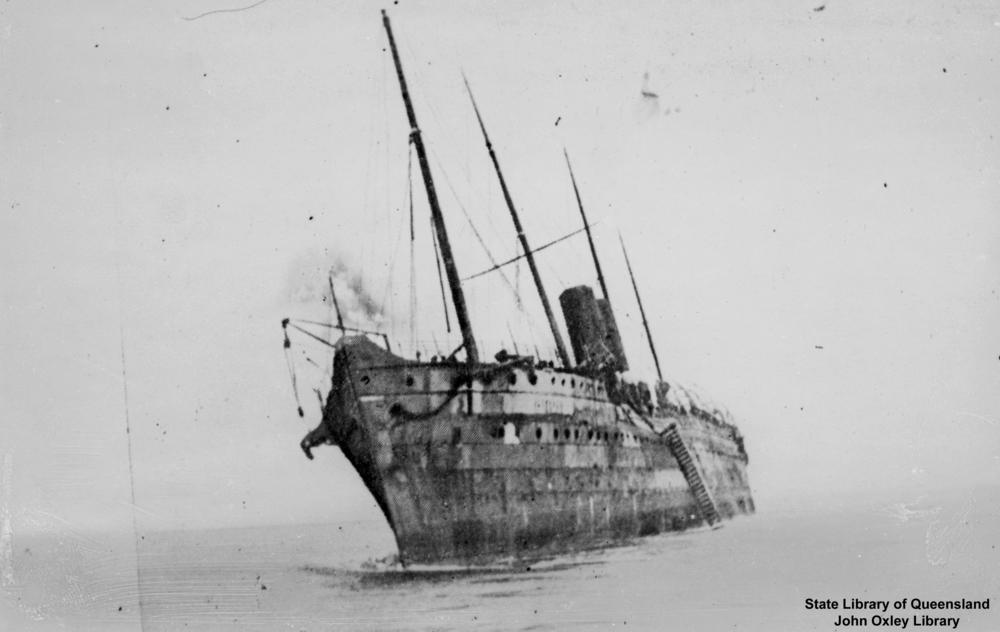
Himalaya's sister ship Australia, aground and burnt out off Point Nepean

Meanwhile Australia was completed in October 1892, and began her maiden voyage to Australia that November. In April and May 1893 Australia set a new speed record, completing her voyage from Tilbury to Adelaide in 26 days and 16 hours. In May and June 1893, Himalaya broke this record.

In the small hours of 20 June 1904 Australia ran aground on Corsair Rock off Point Nepean while approaching Port Phillip. She was being piloted at the time, but her pilot was diabetic and was taken ill. There were no deaths, and most of her cargo was salvaged, but it proved impossible to refloat her. Her fittings were also salvaged, and her wreck was sold in situ.

== First World War ==
In August 1914 Himalaya was in Hong Kong when the Admiralty requisitioned her. She was converted there, and fitted with eight QF 4.7 inch guns as her primary armament. She was commissioned as HMS Himalaya, with the pennant number M.67. She then patrolled the China Seas, and kept watch for German cargo ships such as colliers in neutral Manila trying to reach and supply the Imperial German Navy's East Asia Squadron. She also patrolled the Red Sea, and in February 1915 she helped to repel an Ottoman raid on the Suez Canal. In September 1915 she was recalled to the UK.

On 11 April 1916 Himalaya was recommissioned in Canada Dock in Liverpool. On 20 April she left Canada Dock, and the next day she left Liverpool. She sailed via St Vincent and Saint Helena to Simon's Town Naval Base in South Africa, where she arrived on 16 May. There she was fitted with an aircraft deck, and her 4.7-inch guns were replaced with QF 6-inch naval guns.

=== East Africa ===
Himalaya took part in the East African Campaign from June 1916 until April 1917. On 1 June 1916 she left Simon's Town for Durban, where she embarked troops. On 17 June she left Durban, and on 21 June the Admiralty bought her from P&O. On 23 June she disembarked her troops at Kilindini in British East Africa. The next day she reached the British protectorate of Zanzibar, where she took on a seaplane and bunkered. On 26 June, 31 seedies joined her crew.

From 28 June 1916 Himalaya operated from Zanzibar along the coast of German East Africa. She patrolled the coast, her seaplane provided aerial reconnaissance, and her 6-inch guns contributed to the bombardment of German positions ashore. As a former passenger ship, Himalaya was also well-equipped to carry food and bake bread for British and Empire forces ashore.

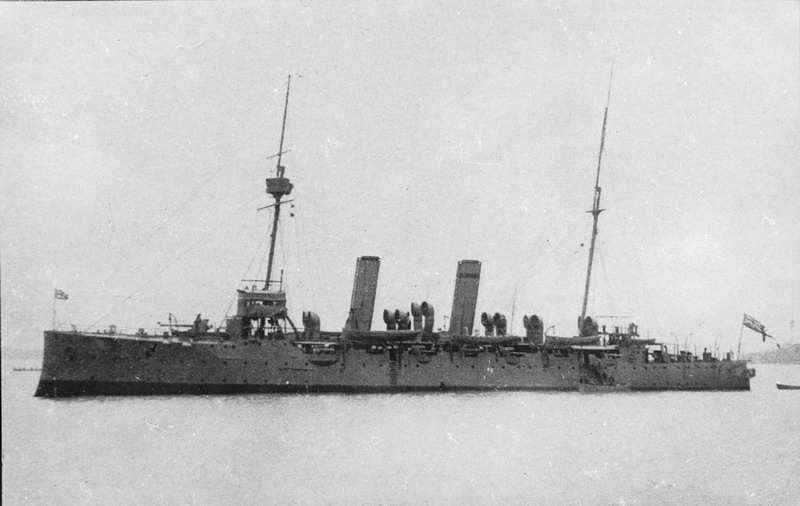
The Royal Navy flotilla in the East African Campaign included the protected cruiser HMS Talbot, with which Himalaya frequently rendezvoused, exchanged stores, or transferred crew members

On 6 August 1916, Himalaya bombarded Dar es Salaam railway station.

Before dawn on 15 August 1916 a Royal Navy flotilla attacked Bagamoyo, bombarding German positions there and landing more than 300 troops and armed sailors to capture the town. The flotilla included the auxiliary ship HMS Manica, which carried both a kite balloon and a seaplane. But Manica's seaplane suffered an engine fault, so at 0553 hrs Himalaya left Zanzibar and steamed for Bagamoyo. At 0725 hrs she stopped to launch her seaplane, which flew ahead the last 20 nautical miles (37 km) or so to Bagamoyo, dropped bombs on German positions, and then provided aerial observations to direct the naval bombardment. At 0854 hrs Himalaya reached the flotilla off Bagamoyo, and her port guns joined in the bombardment.

On 18 August Himalaya bombarded the coastal town of Mikindani, under the direction of her seaplane. On 3 September the German authorities surrendered Dar es Salaam to British forces. On 13 September Himalaya returned to Mikindani carrying Royal Marines, who went ashore by boat and took the town without resistance. On 16 September she did the same at Lindi.

From 21 November until 5 December 1916 Himalaya shuttled troops from Zanzibar, Kilindini and Tanga to Kilwa Kisiwani and Dar es Salaam, including men of the King's African Rifles.

On the morning of 6 January 1917 a Short Brothers seaplane took off from Himalaya for a reconnaissance flight over the Rufiji Delta. The aircraft failed to return, so Himalaya embarked a replacement seaplane and aircrew from HMS Manica.

The missing seaplane had suffered engine failure so its pilot, Flt Lt Edwin Moon, made a forced landing in a creek. He and his observer, Cdr the Hon Richard Bridgeman, DSO, were unable to repair the aircraft, so they burned it and set off for the coast. The two airmen made and used a raft, which on 9 January was swept out to sea. Bridgeman was swept off the raft and Moon was unable to rescue him. A change of tide then swept the raft back to land, where Askari Schutztruppe captured Moon. He spent the remainder of hostilities as a prisoner of war. After the war, Moon was made a DSO for his bravery.

On 29 January 1917 Himalaya left Lindi. She bunkered at Durban, and was in Simon's Town from 10 February. On 20 February an accident caused the death of a chief gunner, Joseph Elliott. An inquest was held two days later, followed by an inquiry the next day. Elliott is buried at Simon's Town.

Himalaya left Simon's Town on 7 March, bunkered again at Cape Town, and then patrolled via Beira in Portuguese Mozambique and Dar es Salaam to Zanzibar, where she arrived on 3 April. On 8 April she left Zanzibar and returned via Dar es Salaam, Beira and Durban to Cape Town, where she arrived on 24 April.

=== South Africa ===
Himalaya stayed in Cape Town until 19 July 1917, including a week being dry docked from 10 to 17 May. From 21 July 1917 Himalaya patrolled from Simon's Town, covering the coast of Cape Province from St Helena Bay in the west to Mossel Bay in the east.

=== Atlantic escort ===
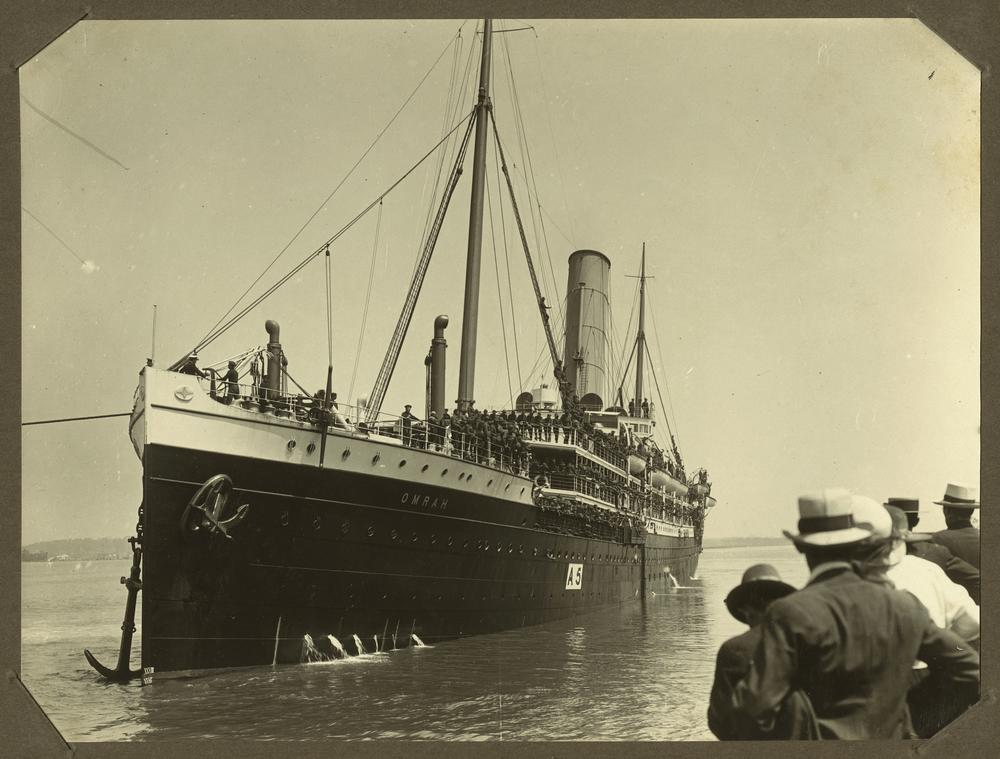
The troop ship Omrah, which Himalaya escorted in two convoys between South Africa and Sierra Leone

From August 1917 until April 1918 Himalaya operated in the Atlantic. She escorted convoys, carried cargo, and carried bullion. Until February 1918 she was based at Simon's Town, where in October 1917 her armament was augmented by the addition of two 6-pounder guns.

Between August 1917 and January 1918 Himalaya made three round trips between South Africa and Sierra Leone. On most of those trips she escorted convoys. However, in October 1917 when she took bullion from Cape Town to Sierra Leone, and in November she took bullion to St Helena before continuing to Sierra Leone.

At Simon's Town on 24 February 1918 all seedies were discharged from Himalaya's crew. Seedies had been part of her crew since June 1916.

Between March and May 1918 Himalaya brought bullion from South Africa to England. She left Cape Town on 2 March and went via Brazil, where she was in Rio de Janeiro from 16 March until 6 April. She reached Devonport in England on 7 May, and unloaded her bullion the next day.

In June 1918 Himalaya escorted a southbound convoy from England to Sierra Leone and then a northbound convoy from Sierra Leone back to England. On her return voyage she brought bullion from Freetown to Devonport. On 29 June Himalaya reached Devonport, where she unloaded her bullion and then the ammunition for her guns. On 16 July 1918 she was paid off from the Royal Navy.

=== Crew losses ===
In almost four years in the Royal Navy, Himalaya never came under enemy attack and lost no personnel to enemy action. However, as well as Cdr Bridgeman and Chief Gunner Elliott in 1917 (see above) she lost four members of her complement to other causes. An able seaman in 1916 and a seedie in 1917 died and were buried at sea. A midshipman was taken ill in 1916, died ashore in hospital and is buried in Dar es Salaam war cemetery. In 1917 a greaser died and was buried in Cape Town.

== Fate ==
The Admiralty may have sold Himalaya back to P&O in Jun 1919. In 1921 she was laid up at Southampton. The Board of Trade bought her in March 1922, and in April sold her on to the shipbrokers Stelp and Leighton of London.

On 31 April the tugs Creteboom and Cretegaff towed Himalaya out of Southampton. On 14 May 1922 she reached Bremen, where on 16 May work to scrap her began.

== Bibliography ==
- Cato, Conrad (1919). The Navy Everywhere. Constable: London.
- Dowling, R (1909) [1903]. All About Ships & Shipping (2nd ed.). London: Alexander Moring Ltd.
- "Steamers". Lloyd's Register of Shipping. Vol. I. London: Lloyd's Register of Shipping. 1914.
- The Marconi Press Agency Ltd (1913). The Year Book of Wireless Telegraphy and Telephony. London: The St Katherine Press.
