= HMS Himalaya (1854) =

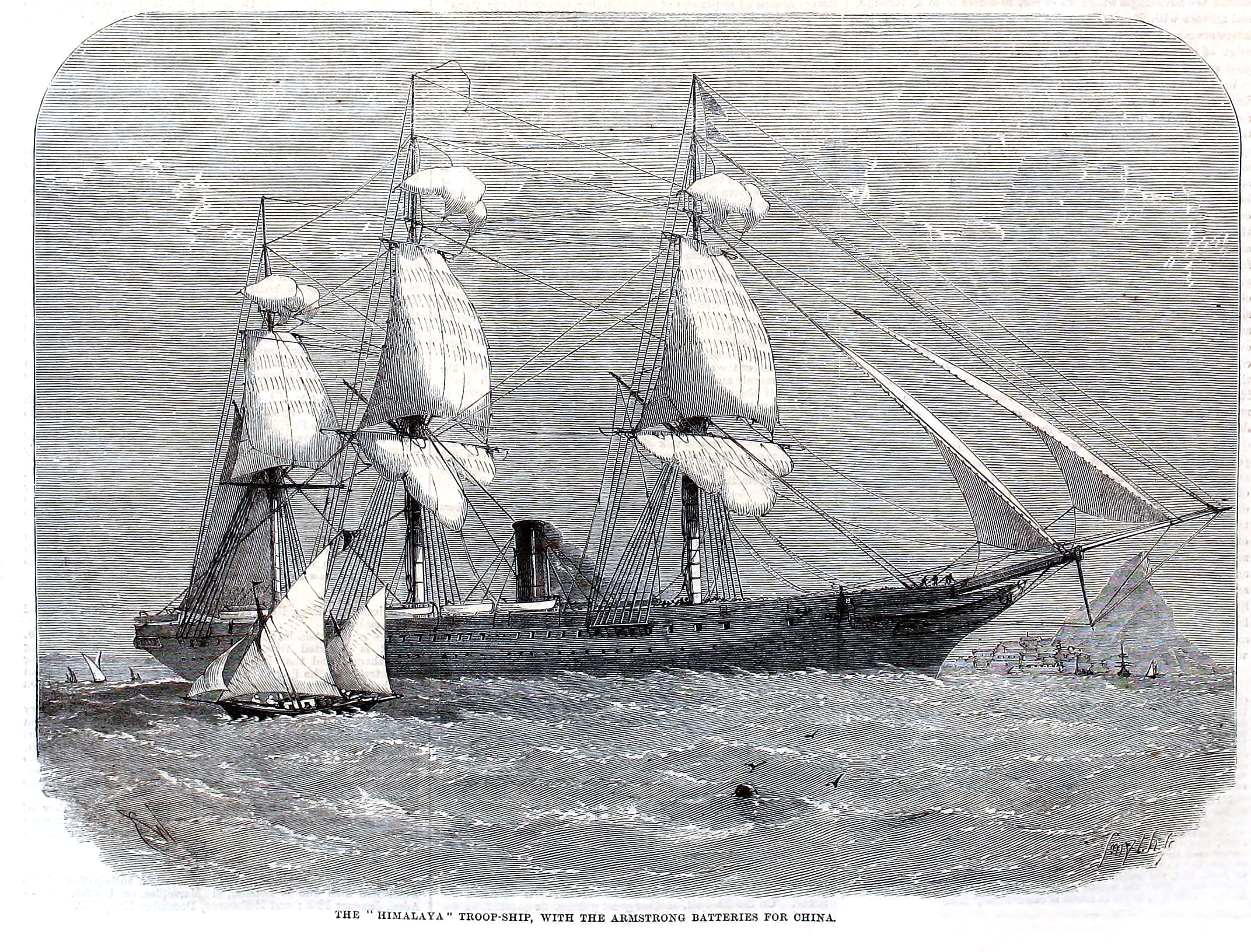
- HMS Himalaya carrying Armstrong Guns to the Second Opium War, 1860, from the Illustrated London News

History

United Kingdom
- Name: Himalaya
- Namesake: The Himalayas
- Owner: Peninsular and Oriental Steam Navigation Company, London
- Route: Southampton – Alexandria
- Builder: C. J. Mare & Co., Leamouth, London
- Laid down: November 1851
- Launched: 24 May 1853
- Completed: 9 January 1854
- Out of service: 14 July 1854 sold to British Government

United Kingdom
- Name: HMS Himalaya
- Acquired: 14 July 1854
- Out of service: Sold 28 September 1920
- Renamed: C60 in December 1895
- Reclassified: Coal hulk, December 1895
- Fate: Sunk, 12 June 1940

General characteristics
- Type: steam passenger ship (1853–1854); steam troopship (1854–1895); coal hulk (1895–1940)
- Tonnage: 3,438 GRT, 2,327 NRT
- Displacement: 4,690 tons
- Length: 339 ft (103 m)
- Beam: 46 ft (14 m)
- Propulsion: Single expansion steam, single screw
- Sail plan: Full-rigged ship
- Speed: 14 knots (26 km/h; 16 mph) under steam; 16.5 knots (30.6 km/h; 19.0 mph) with sails assisting
- Capacity: 3,000 troops
- Complement: 213 crew

HMS Himalaya was built for the Peninsular and Oriental Steam Navigation Company as SS Himalaya, a 3,438-gross register ton iron steam screw passenger ship. She was purchased by the Royal Navy in 1854 for use as a troopship until 1894 and was then moored in the Hamoaze, Devonport to serve as a Navy coal hulk until 1920, when sold off. She was sunk during a German air attack on Portland Harbour in 1940.

== Design and construction ==
Himalaya was ordered by the Peninsular and Oriental Steam Navigation Company (P&O) and laid down at the yard of C. J. Mare & Co., Leamouth, London in November 1851 as an iron paddle steamer, half as large again as any of P&O's previous vessels. With rising coal prices, paddle propulsion was too inefficient and she was altered to a screw vessel while still on the stocks. She was fitted with a two-cylinder simple expansion horizontal trunk engine made by John Penn and Sons at Greenwich of 700 nominal horsepower or 2,050 indicated horsepower (1,530 kW), with a single two-bladed propeller of 18 feet (5.5 m) diameter driving her at a speed of 13 knots (24 km/h; 15 mph). The ship had a length of 372.9 ft (113.7 m), a beam of 46.2 ft (14.1 m), and a depth of 34.9 ft (10.6 m) and measured 3,438 gross register tons (GRT) and 2,327 net register tons (NRT). She was also fitted with sails on three masts for use when the wind was favourable. She was launched on 24 May 1853 by Lady Matheson, wife of the P&O chairman, Sir James Matheson, but did not carry out trials until 9 January 1854. Himalaya had cabin accommodation for 200 first and second class passengers, requiring a crew of 213, and could accommodate 2,000 troops or emigrants. She was said at the time to be the biggest ship ever built.

== P&O service ==
The new ship left the Thames on 12 January 1854 for Southampton, arriving the following day, and then on 21 January sailed on her maiden voyage to Alexandria, via Gibraltar and Malta, with passengers, mail and specie for onward carriage to India and China. By the time she returned to Southampton on 16 February, Himalaya had been chartered to carry troops to Constantinople. In early March she sailed from Southampton and Plymouth for the Mediterranean with 1,452 troops and equipment.

P&O had concluded that Himalaya was a larger vessel than the passenger traffic demanded and, with coal becoming more expensive with the advent of war in the Crimea, would not be economic. In July 1854, after another trooping voyage, to Scutari, the company was able to persuade the British Government to buy her to use as a troopship for £133,000, a little above her cost price of £130,000.

== Naval career ==
After purchase, Himalaya was converted to carry up to 3,000 soldiers and subsequently served as a troopship for four decades. The purchase was initially viewed with suspicion by some naval experts; in the light of high losses of iron-hulled transports taken up from trade, General Howard Douglas concluded that ships such as Himalaya would prove unsatisfactory, particularly due to their vulnerability to gunfire. Nevertheless, Himalaya served as a troopship for four decades. During this time she supported operations during the Second Opium War, and carried troops to India, South Africa, the Gold Coast, and North America. In July 1857, she ran aground in the Strait of Banca. She was refloated on 8 July with assistance from the British merchant ship Gauntlet. On 8 October 1859, Himalaya discovered the British barque Norma in a sinking condition, having been struck by a gale two days before. Norma was taken in tow, the pair reaching Bermuda on 12 October. In 1863 the troopship was re-engined at the Keyham Steam Yard with a new two-cylinder horizontal single expansion engine, of 2,609 ihp. In January 1870, Himalaya rescued the crew of the British ship Yarrow, which had been abandoned in the Mediterranean Sea. On 18 October 1879, she collided with the Danish brig Ane Catherine, which was severely damaged. HMS Himalaya towed her in to Gibraltar. On 30 November 1880, she was briefly aground at Queenstown, County Cork, floating off in half an hour and resuming her departure undamaged.

She retired from trooping service and was decommissioned on 28 September 1894. Retained to become a coal hulk in the Hamoaze, Devonport, in December 1895, and with the new name C60, she was sent to Hull for conversion by Earle's Shipbuilding Co to a vessel able to store 4,500 tons of coal. She returned to Devonport at the end of June 1896.

C60 was sold out of the navy on 28 September 1920 to a private owner, E. W. Payne, and towed to Portland Harbour as Himalaya, to continue as a coal hulk. She remained in this role until the Second World War. She was sunk by air attack, by Junkers Ju 87 dive bombers of the German Luftwaffe, on 12 June 1940.

== Legacy ==
Himalaya's figurehead of an Indian warrior is preserved in the National Maritime Museum, Greenwich.
