= Eggs-and-bacon =

Eggs-and-bacon or eggs and bacon is a common name for various plants with yellow and red flowers in the family Fabaceae, including:

- Lotus corniculatus, native to Eurasia and North Africa
- The Bossiaeeae and Mirbelieae tribes of legumes native to Australia, including genera:
  - Aenictophyton
  - Almaleea
  - Aotus
  - Bossiaea
  - Callistachys
  - Chorizema
  - Daviesia
  - Dillwynia
  - Erichsenia
  - Euchilopsis
  - Eutaxia
  - Gastrolobium
  - Gompholobium
  - Goodia
  - Isotropis
  - Jacksonia
  - Latrobea
  - Leptosema
  - Mirbelia
  - Muelleranthus
  - Oxylobium
  - Phyllota
  - Platylobium
  - Podolobium
  - Ptychosema
  - Pultenaea
  - Sphaerolobium
  - Stonesiella
  - Urodon
  - Viminaria

== See also ==
- Butter-and-eggs (disambiguation)
