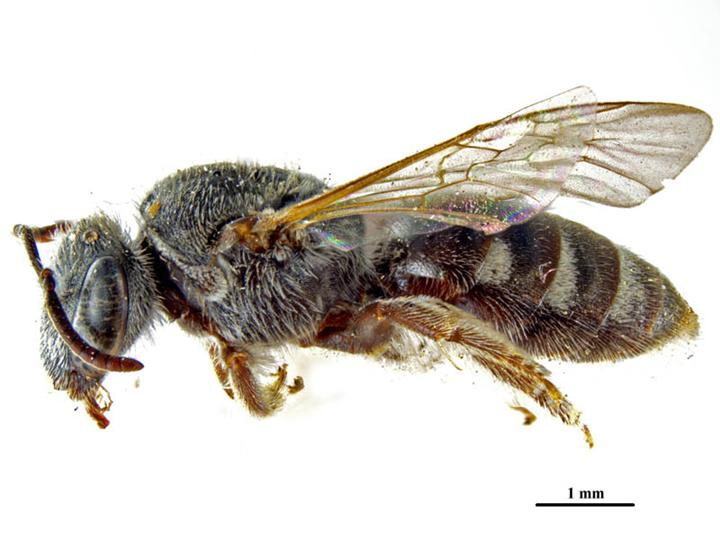
- Female
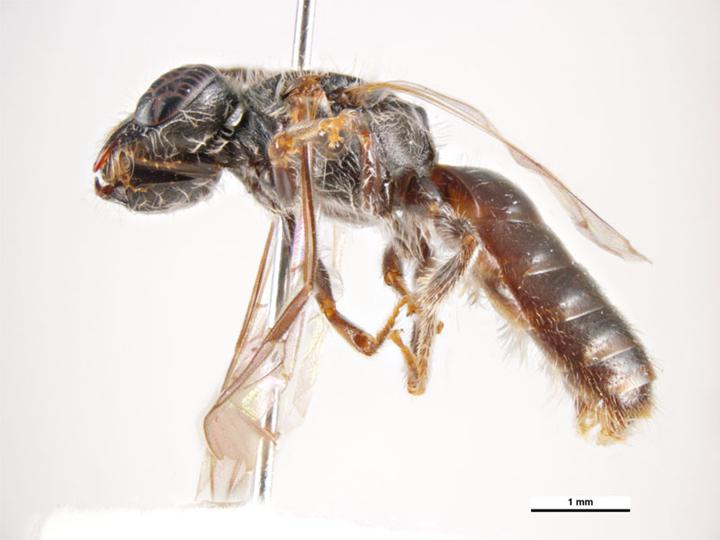
- Male

Scientific classification
- Kingdom: Animalia
- Phylum: Arthropoda
- Clade: Pancrustacea
- Class: Insecta
- Order: Hymenoptera
- Family: Halictidae
- Genus: Lasioglossum
- Species: L. opacicolle

Binomial name
- Lasioglossum opacicolle (Cockerell, 1914)

Synonyms
- Halictus opacicollis Cockerell, 1914; Halictus furneauxi Cockerell, 1915

= Lasioglossum opacicolle =

Species of bee

Lasioglossum opacicolle, or Lasioglossum (Chilalictus) opacicolle, is a species of bee in the family Halictidae and subfamily Halictinae. It is endemic to Australia. It was described by British-American entomologist Theodore Dru Alison Cockerell in 1914.

== Description ==
Female body length is about 7 mm. Integumental colouration is mainly black, with reddish and brown markings; the hair is dull white.

== Distribution and habitat ==
The species occurs in south-eastern Australia. Type localities include Eaglehawk Neck in Tasmania.

== Behaviour ==
The adults are flying mellivores. Flowering plants visited by the bees include Acacia, Aotus, Bossiaea, Dillwynia, Eriostemon, Eucalyptus, Hibbertia, Leptospermum, Leucopogon, Lythrum, Phyllota, Platylobium, Prostanthera, Pultenaea and Richardia species.
