= Eggs and bacon (disambiguation) =

Eggs and bacon may refer to:

- Eggs and bacon, a part of a full breakfast
- Eggs-and-bacon, a common name for various plants with yellow and red flowers in the family Fabaceae
- Egg and bacon, a nickname for the colours (gold and scarlet) of the Marylebone Cricket Club
- Eggs and Bacon Bay, a community in Tasmania
