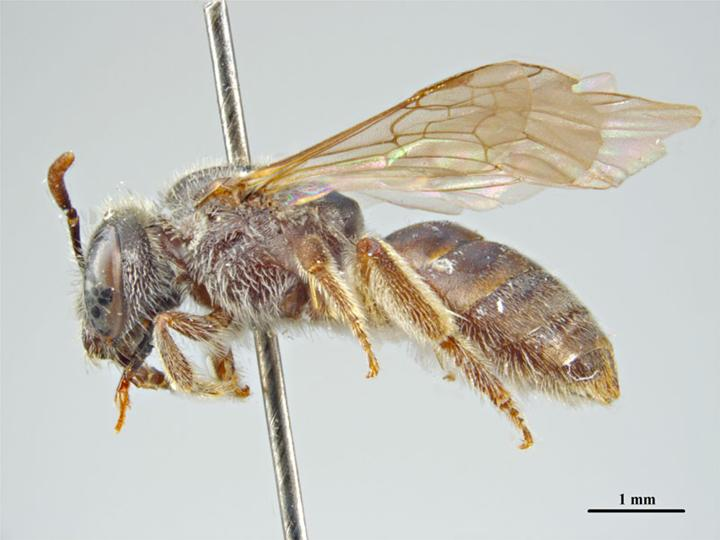
- Female
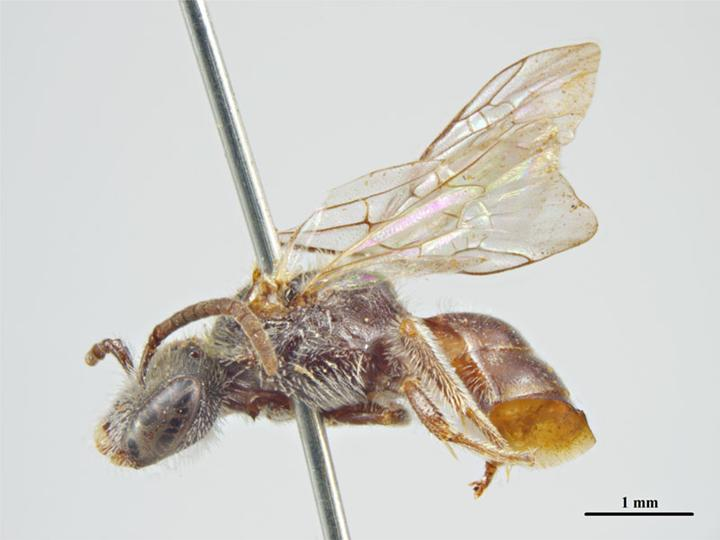
- Male

Scientific classification
- Kingdom: Animalia
- Phylum: Arthropoda
- Clade: Pancrustacea
- Class: Insecta
- Order: Hymenoptera
- Family: Halictidae
- Genus: Lasioglossum
- Species: L. victoriellum

Binomial name
- Lasioglossum victoriellum (Cockerell, 1914)

Synonyms
- Halictus victoriellus Cockerell, 1914; Halictus emeraldensis Rayment, 1936

= Lasioglossum victoriellum =

Species of bee

Lasioglossum victoriellum, or Lasioglossum (Chilalictus) victoriellum, is a species of bee in the family Halictidae and subfamily Halictinae. It is endemic to Australia. It was described by British-American entomologist Theodore Dru Alison Cockerell in 1914.

== Description ==
Female body length is about 6 mm. Integumental colouration is mainly black, with reddish markings.

== Distribution and habitat ==
The species occurs in south-western and south-eastern mainland Australia. Type localities include Emerald, Victoria.

== Behaviour ==
The adults are flying mellivores. They nest gregariously in loose sand or soil. Flowering plants visited by the bees include Acacia, Arctotheca, Banksia, Bossiaea, Centaurium, Daviesia, Dianella, Epacris, Eucalyptus, Goodenia, Hakea, Helichrysum, Hibbertia, Kunzea, Leptospermum, Melaleuca, Phyllota, Pimelea, Platylobium, Prostanthera, Pultenaea, Stackhousia, Veronica and Westringia species.
