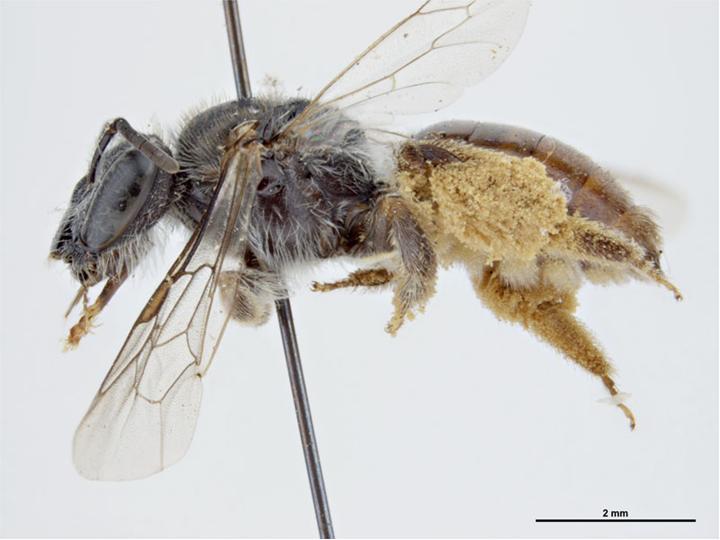
- Female

Scientific classification
- Kingdom: Animalia
- Phylum: Arthropoda
- Clade: Pancrustacea
- Class: Insecta
- Order: Hymenoptera
- Family: Colletidae
- Genus: Leioproctus
- Species: L. cyaneorufus

Binomial name
- Leioproctus cyaneorufus (Cockerell, 1930)

Synonyms
- Paracolletes cyaneorufus Cockerell, 1930; Leioproctus (Leioproctus) unguidentatus Michener, 1965

= Leioproctus cyaneorufus =

Species of bee

Leioproctus cyaneorufus, or Leioproctus (Leioproctus) cyaneorufus, is a species of bee in the family Colletidae and subfamily Colletinae. It is endemic to Australia. It was described by British-American entomologist Theodore Dru Alison Cockerell in 1930.

== Description ==
Female body length is about 7.5 mm. Integumental colouration is mainly black; the abdomen is a "dusky chestnut red, with a delicate purple suffusion"; the hair is white and brown.

== Distribution and habitat ==
The species occurs in eastern Australia. Type localities include Bribie Island and Dunwich, Queensland.

== Behaviour ==
The adults are flying mellivores. Flowering plants visited by the bees include Aotus species.

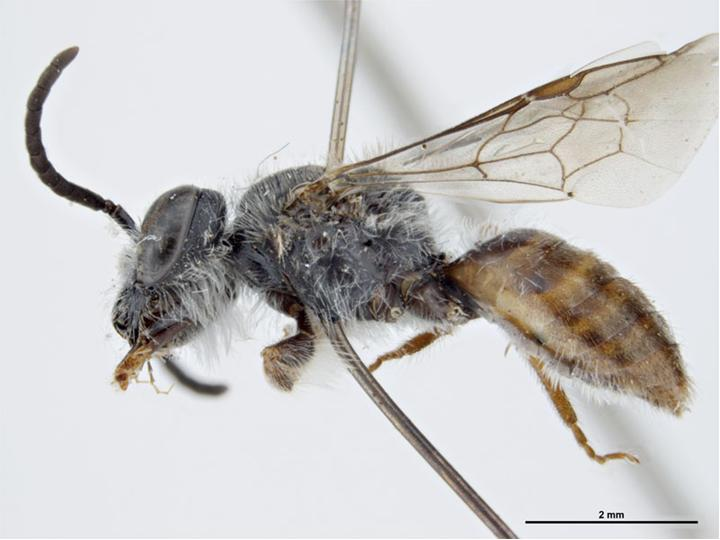
Male
