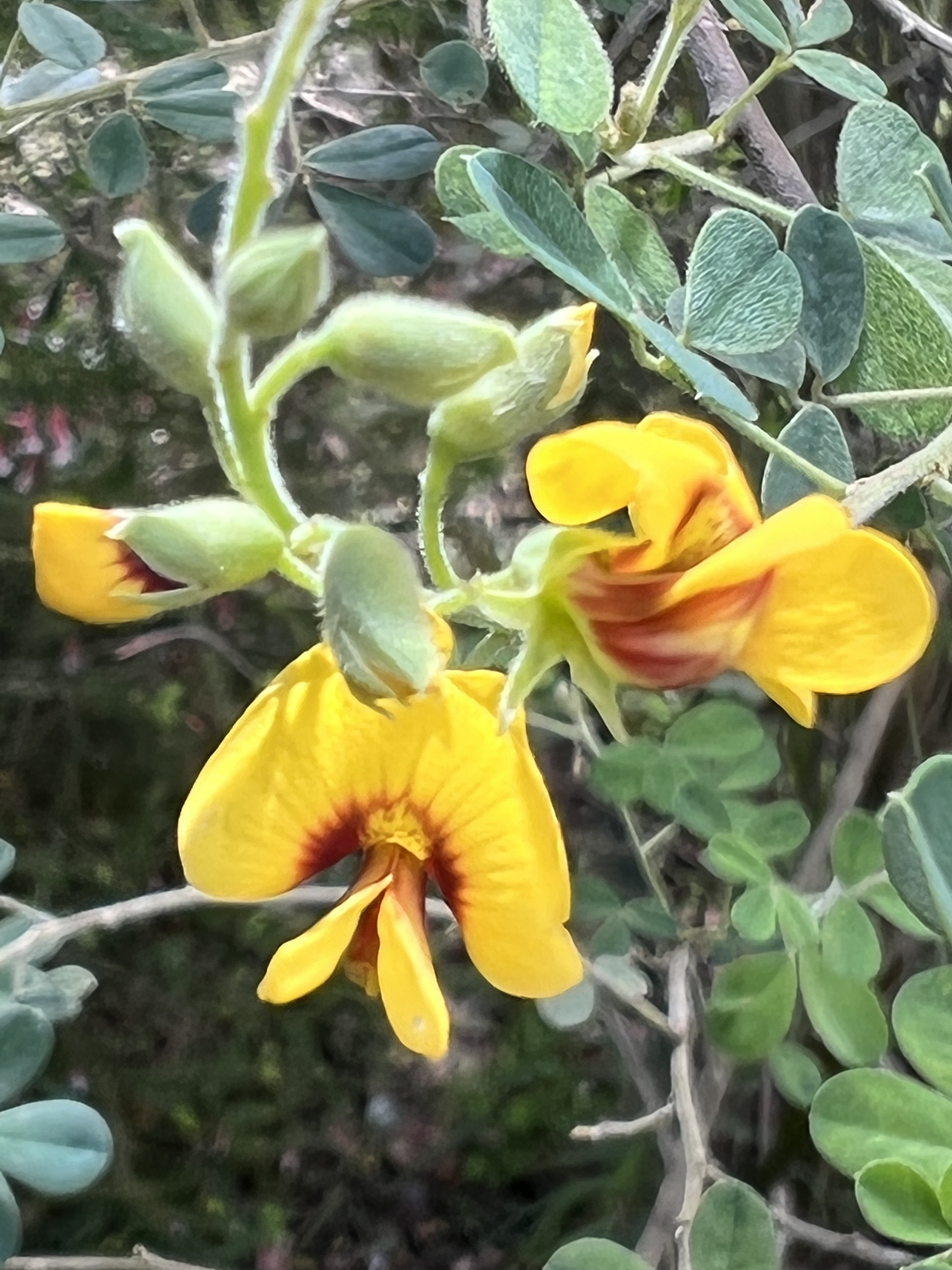

Scientific classification
- Kingdom: Plantae
- Clade: Tracheophytes
- Clade: Angiosperms
- Clade: Eudicots
- Clade: Rosids
- Order: Fabales
- Family: Fabaceae
- Subfamily: Faboideae
- Genus: Goodia
- Species: G. pubescens

Binomial name
- Goodia pubescens Sims

= Goodia pubescens =

Golden tip

Species of legume

Goodia pubescens, commonly known as golden tip, is a species of flowering plant in the family Fabaceae and is endemic to south-eastern Australia. It has trifoliate leaves and bright yellow pea flowers.

== Description ==
Goodia pubescens is a shrub or slender tree that typically grows to a height of 2 m (6 ft 7 in) high, its new branchlets thickly covered with flattened or spreading hairs. The leaves are trifoliate, the petiole 5–30 mm (0.20–1.18 in) long, the leaflets elliptic, the end leaflet usually egg-shaped with the narrower end towards the base, 10–40 mm (0.39–1.57 in) long, 6–20 mm (0.24–0.79 in) wide with scattered hairs on both surfaces. The flowers are borne in racemes 20–60 mm (0.79–2.36 in) long, bright yellow with red or brown markings, 9–14 mm (0.35–0.55 in) long, each flower a pedicel 3–8 mm (0.12–0.31 in) long. The calyx is 4–6.5 mm (0.16–0.26 in) long and softly-hairy. Flowering occurs from September to November and the fruit is an oblong to narrowly-elliptic pod 1–2 cm (0.39–0.79 in) long narrowing to a thin stalk.

== Taxonomy and naming ==
Goodia pubescens was first formally described in 1810 by John Sims and the description was published in the Botanical Magazine. The specific epithet (pubescens) means "downy with soft, fine hairs".

This species has sometimes been treated as a variety of G. lotifolia.

== Distribution and habitat ==
Golden tip grows in forest in the Grampians, Otways and Central Highlands of Victoria, and in Tasmania.
