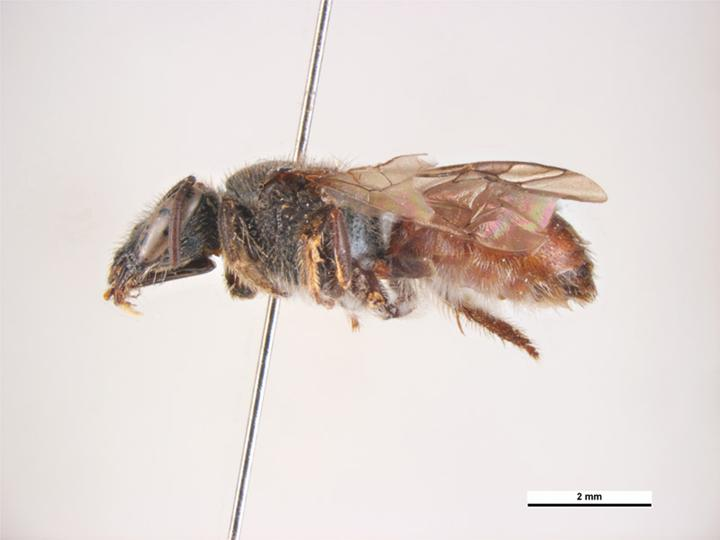
- Female

Scientific classification
- Kingdom: Animalia
- Phylum: Arthropoda
- Clade: Pancrustacea
- Class: Insecta
- Order: Hymenoptera
- Family: Halictidae
- Genus: Lasioglossum
- Species: L. turneri

Binomial name
- Lasioglossum turneri (Cockerell, 1914)

Synonyms
- Parasphecodes turneri Cockerell, 1914

= Lasioglossum turneri =

Species of bee

Lasioglossum turneri, or Lasioglossum (Parasphecodes) turneri, is a species of bee in the family Halictidae and subfamily Halictinae. It is endemic to Australia. It was described by British-American entomologist Theodore Dru Alison Cockerell in 1914.

== Description ==
Female body length is about 8.5 mm, male 8 mm. Integumental colouration is mainly black, the abdomen deep chestnut-red; with white to dark brownish-grey and black hair.

== Distribution and habitat ==
The species occurs in south-eastern Australia. The type locality is Eaglehawk Neck in Tasmania.

== Behaviour ==
The adults are flying mellivores. Flowering plants visited by the bees include Hibbertia, Acacia, Phyllota, Eucalyptus, Kunzea, Adenanthos and Photinia species.
