= Aotus =

Aotus (the name is derived from the Ancient Greek words for "earless" in both cases: the monkey is missing external ears, and the pea is missing earlike bracteoles) may refer to:

- Aotus (plant), one of the plant genera commonly known as golden peas in the family Fabaceae (bean family)
- Aotus (monkey), the genus of night monkeys in the family Aotidae
- AOTUS, the acronym for the Archivist of the United States
