= V. juncea =

V. juncea may refer to:

- Viminaria juncea, a pea endemic to Australia
- Virgularia juncea, a sea pen
