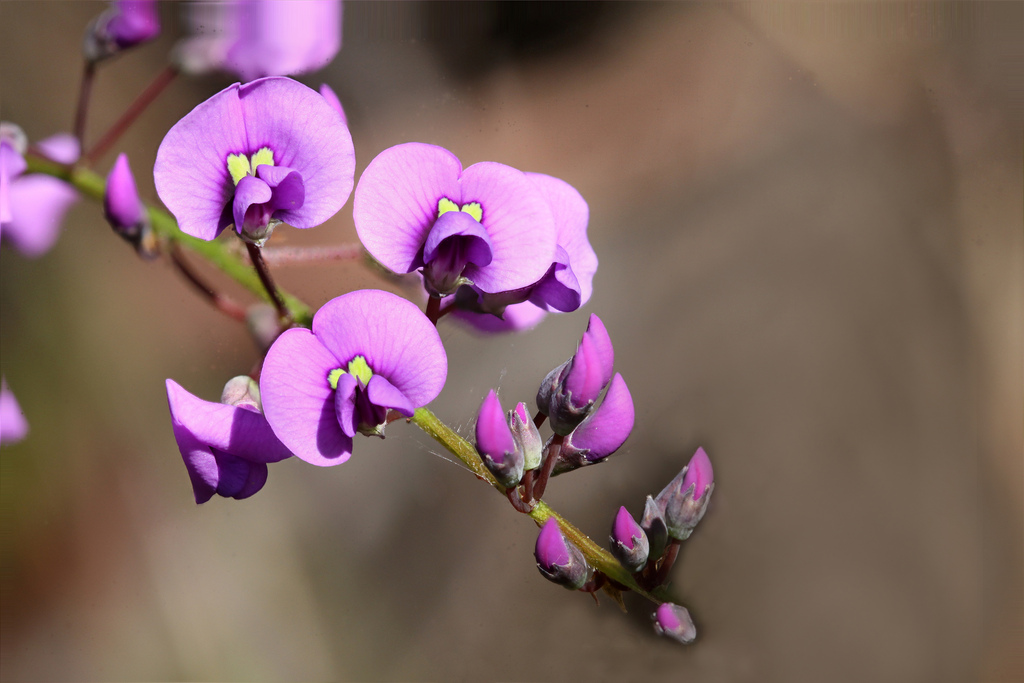
- Mirbelia floribunda

Scientific classification
- Kingdom: Plantae
- Clade: Tracheophytes
- Clade: Angiosperms
- Clade: Eudicots
- Clade: Rosids
- Order: Fabales
- Family: Fabaceae
- Subfamily: Faboideae
- Clade: Meso-Papilionoideae
- Clade: Non-protein amino acid-accumulating clade
- Clade: Mirbelioids; Wojciechowski et al. 2004

Type genus
- Mirbelia Sm.

Genera and subclades
- See text

Synonyms
- Bossiaeeae (Benth.) Hutch 1964; Genisteae subtribe Bossiaeinae Benth. 1865; Mirbelieae (Benth.) Polhill & Crisp 1982; Podalyrieae subtribe Mirbeliinae Benth. 1837

= Mirbelioids =

Group of legumes

The Mirbelioids are an informal subdivision of the plant family Fabaceae that includes the former tribes Bossiaeeae and Mirbelieae. They are consistently recovered as a monophyletic clade in molecular phylogenies. The Mirbelioids arose 48.4 ± 1.3 million years ago (in the early Eocene). Members of this clade are mostly ericoid (sclerophyllous) shrubs with yellow and red ('egg and bacon') flowers found in Australia, Tasmania, and Papua-New Guinea. The name of this clade is informal and is not assumed to have any particular taxonomic rank like the names authorized by the ICBN or the ICPN. Members of this clade exhibit unusual embryology compared to other legumes, either enlarged antipodal cells in the embryo sac or the production of multiple embryo sacs. There has been a shift from bee pollination to bird pollination several times in this clade. Mirbelioids produce quinolizidine alkaloids, but unlike most papilionoids, they do not produce isoflavones. Many of the Mirbelioids have pseudoraceme inflorescences.

== Genera ==
The Mirbelioids have been circumscribed to include the following genera:

=== Giant antipodals group ===
- Aenictophyton A. T. Lee
- Bossiaea Vent.
- Daviesia Sm.
- Erichsenia Hemsl.
- Gompholobium Sm.
- Goodia Salisb.
- Muelleranthus Hutch.
- Paragoodia I. Thomps.
- Platylobium Sm.
- Ptychosema Benth. ex Lindl.
- Sphaerolobium Sm.
- Viminaria Sm.

=== Multiple embryo-sac group ===
==== Basal grade ====
- Isotropis Benth.
- Jacksonia R. Br. ex Sm.
- Leptosema Benth.

==== Callistachys group ====
- Callistachys Vent.
- Gastrolobium R.Br.

==== Oxylobium grade ====
- Chorizema Labill.
- Mirbelia Sm.
- Oxylobium Andrews
- Podolobium R. Br.

==== Pultenaea group ====
- Almaleea Crisp & P. H. Weston
- Aotus Sm.
- Dillwynia Sm.
- Euchilopsis F. Muell.
- Eutaxia R. Br.
- Latrobea Sm.
- Phyllota (DC.) Benth.
- Pultenaea Sm.
- Stonesiella Crisp & P. H. Weston
- Urodon Turcz.

It has been proposed that many of these genera be subsumed into Pultenaea.
