= Goodia parviflora =

Scientific classification
- Kingdom: Plantae
- Clade: Tracheophytes
- Clade: Angiosperms
- Clade: Eudicots
- Clade: Rosids
- Order: Fabales
- Family: Fabaceae
- Subfamily: Faboideae
- Genus: Goodia
- Species: G. parviflora

Binomial name
- Goodia parviflora I.Thomps.

Species of legume

Goodia parviflora is a species of flowering plant in the family Fabaceae and is endemic to Queensland. It is a shrub with trifoliate leaves, the leaflets elliptic to more or less round, and yellow or orange-yellow and red and purplish, pea-like flowers.

== Description ==
Goodia parviflora is a shrub that typically grows to a height of up to about 1 m (3 ft 3 in) and has new growth that soon becomes glabrous. Its leaves are trifoliate with elliptic to more or less round leaflets, 10–25 mm (0.39–0.98 in) long and 8–25 mm (0.31–0.98 in) wide on a petiole 3–10 mm (0.12–0.39 in) long. The flowers are yellow or orange-yellow with a red and purplish flare at the base, arranged in racemes up to 60 mm (2.4 in) long, each flower on a pedicel 2–3 mm (0.079–0.118 in) long with bracteoles about 1 mm (0.039 in) long at the base. The sepals are 2.0–3.5 mm (0.079–0.138 in) long and joined at the base, the lower three sepal lobes about 1 mm (0.039 in) long. The standard petal is 5–6 mm (0.20–0.24 in) long and about 5 mm (0.20 in) wide on a stalk 3–4 mm (0.12–0.16 in) long, the wings 5–6 mm (0.20–0.24 in) long and purplish-brown, and the keel is red and about 5 mm (0.20 in) long. Flowering occurs at various times and the fruit is an oblong, tan-coloured pod 15–22 mm (0.59–0.87 in) long on a stalk 5–8 mm (0.20–0.31 in) long.

== Taxonomy ==
Goodia parviflora was first formally described in 2011 by Ian R. Thompson in the journal Muelleria, from specimens collected in the Coominglah State Forest near Monto by Anthony Bean in 1996. The specific epithet (parviflora) means "small-flowered".

== Distribution and habitat ==
This pea grows in loamy soils in woodland or forest in south-eastern Queensland.
