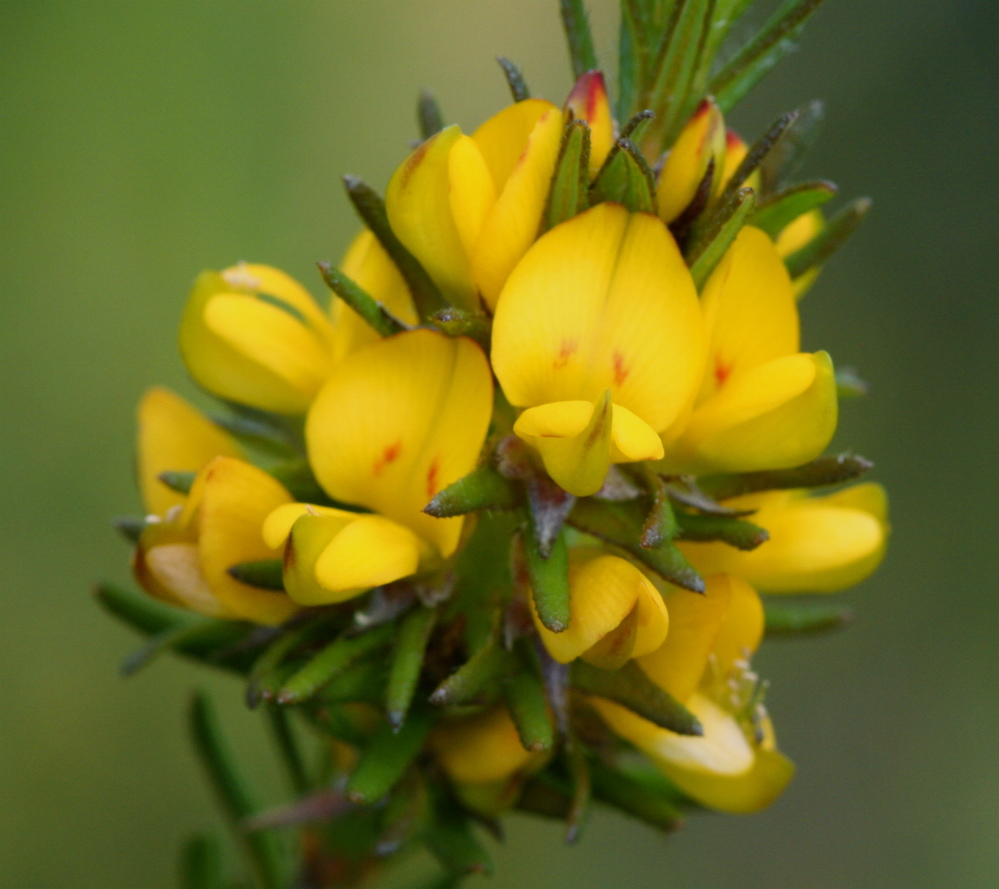

Scientific classification
- Kingdom: Plantae
- Clade: Tracheophytes
- Clade: Angiosperms
- Clade: Eudicots
- Clade: Rosids
- Order: Fabales
- Family: Fabaceae
- Subfamily: Faboideae
- Genus: Phyllota
- Species: P. phylicoides

Binomial name
- Phyllota phylicoides (Sieber ex DC.) Benth. (1837)

Synonyms
- Phyllota aspera (Sieber ex DC.) Benth. (1837); Phyllota baueri Benth. (1837); Phyllota billardierei Benth. (1837); Phyllota comosa (Sieber ex DC.) Benth. (1837); Phyllota phylicoides var. aspera (Sieber ex DC.) Domin (1926); Phyllota phylicoides var. baueri (Benth.) Domin (1926); Phyllota phylicoides var. billardierei (Benth.) Domin (1926); Phyllota phylicoides var. comosa (Sieber ex DC.) Domin (1926); Phyllota phylicoides var. typica Domin (1926), not validly publ.; Phyllota sturtii Benth. (1864); Pultenaea aspera Sieber ex DC. (1825); Pultenaea comosa Sieber ex DC. (1825); Pultenaea phylicoides Sieber ex DC. (1825)

= Phyllota phylicoides =

Species of legume

Phyllota phylicoides is a species of flowering plant in the pea family (Fabaceae) found in New South Wales and Queensland. It was first described by George Bentham in 1837.
