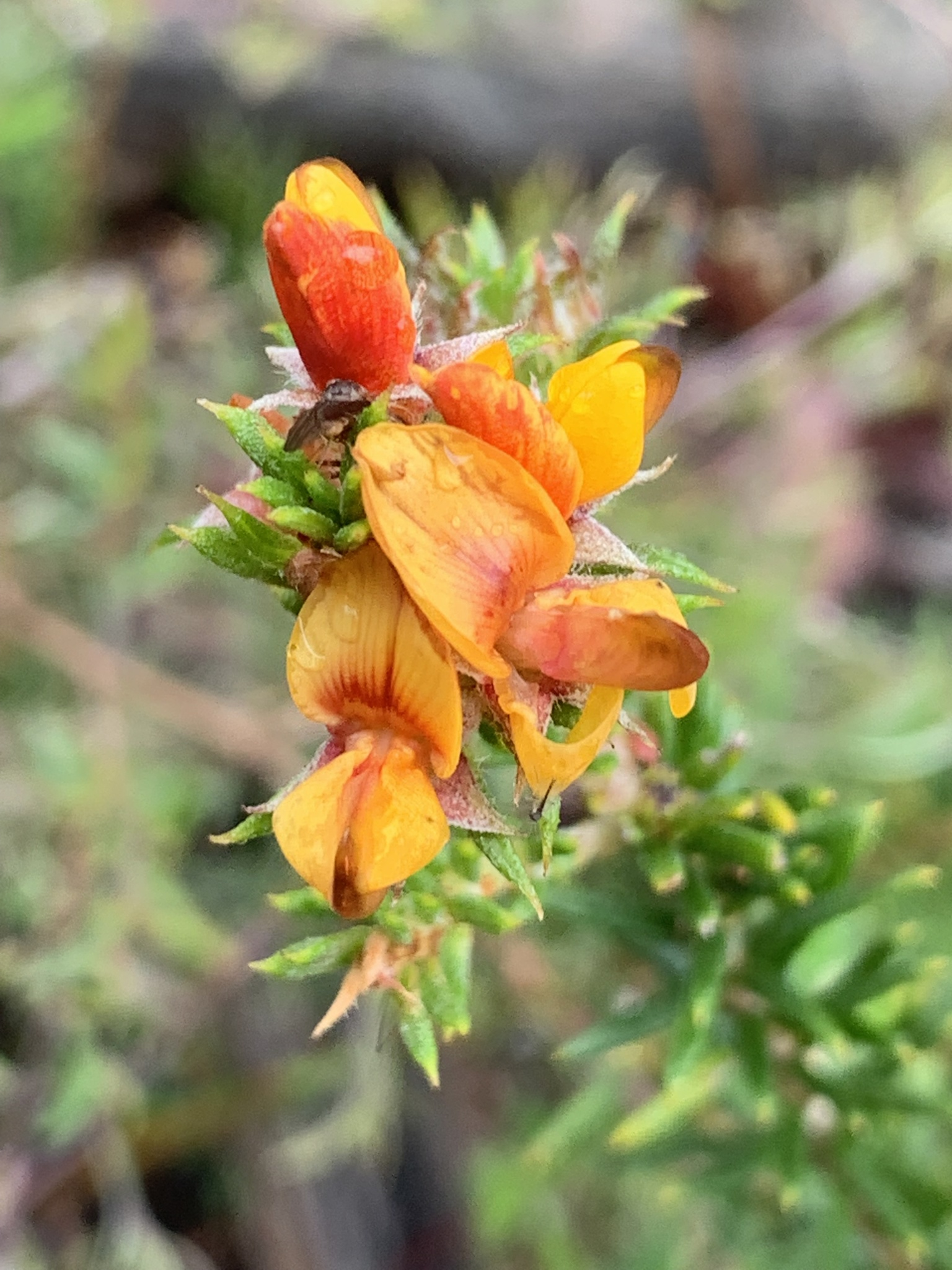

Scientific classification
- Kingdom: Plantae
- Clade: Tracheophytes
- Clade: Angiosperms
- Clade: Eudicots
- Clade: Rosids
- Order: Fabales
- Family: Fabaceae
- Subfamily: Faboideae
- Genus: Phyllota
- Species: P. squarrosa

Binomial name
- Phyllota squarrosa (DC.) Benth.

= Phyllota squarrosa =

Species of legume

Phyllota squarrosa, commonly known as the dense phyllota, is a species of flowering plant in the pea family (Fabaceae) from eastern Australia. It was given its current name by George Bentham in 1837.
