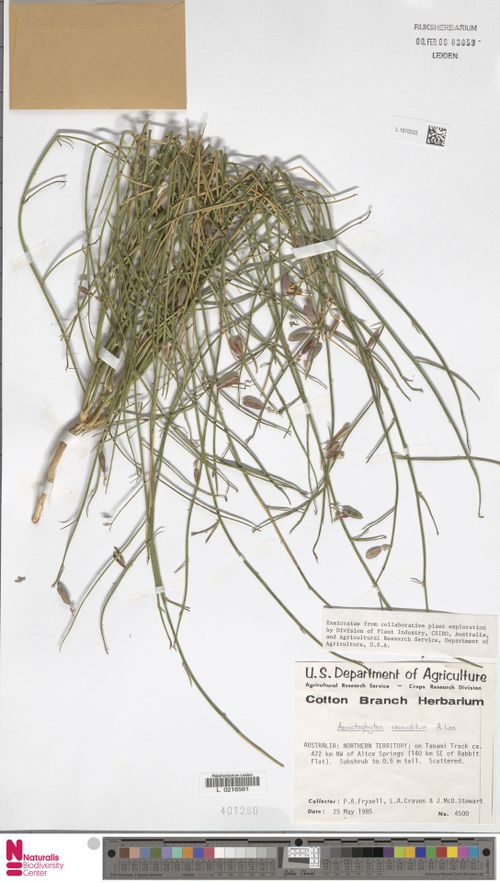

Scientific classification
- Kingdom: Plantae
- Clade: Tracheophytes
- Clade: Angiosperms
- Clade: Eudicots
- Clade: Rosids
- Order: Fabales
- Family: Fabaceae
- Subfamily: Faboideae
- Genus: Aenictophyton
- Species: A. reconditum

Binomial name
- Aenictophyton reconditum A.T.Lee

= Aenictophyton reconditum =

Plant species

Aenictophyton reconditum is a plant in the Fabaceae family, endemic to Australia, and first described in 1973 by Alma Theodora Lee, from a specimen collected in central Australia.

It is found in the north of Western Australia and in the Northern Territory.

It is a wiry, almost leafless shrub growing from 0.3 to 0.6 m high, on sand dunes. Its yellow and orange and brown flowers may be seen from May to November.
