= Goodia stenocarpa =

Scientific classification
- Kingdom: Plantae
- Clade: Tracheophytes
- Clade: Angiosperms
- Clade: Eudicots
- Clade: Rosids
- Order: Fabales
- Family: Fabaceae
- Subfamily: Faboideae
- Genus: Goodia
- Species: G. stenocarpa

Binomial name
- Goodia stenocarpa I.Thomps.

Species of legume

Goodia stenocarpa is a species of flowering plant in the family Fabaceae and is endemic to inland Western Australia. It is a shrub with trifoliate leaves, the leaflets egg-shaped with the narrower end towards the base, and yellow or orange-yellow and red and purplish-brown, pea-like flowers.

== Description ==
Goodia stenocarpa is a shrub that typically grows to a height of up to about 1 m (3 ft 3 in) and has moderately hairy new growth. Its leaves are trifoliate with egg-shaped leaflets, the narrower end towards the base, 10–25 mm (0.39–0.98 in) long and 8–20 mm (0.31–0.79 in) wide on a petiole 2–7 mm (0.079–0.276 in) long. The flowers are yellow or orange-yellow with a red and purplish-brown flare at the base, arranged in racemes up to 100 mm (3.9 in) long, each flower on a pedicel 4–8 mm (0.16–0.31 in) long with bracts about 5 mm (0.20 in) long and bracteoles 1–4 mm (0.039–0.157 in) long at the base. The sepals are 4–5 mm (0.16–0.20 in) long and joined at the base, the lower three sepal lobes 2–3 mm (0.079–0.118 in) long. The standard petal is 8–9 mm (0.31–0.35 in) long and 9–10 mm (0.35–0.39 in) wide on a stalk 2.5 mm (0.098 in) long, the wings about 7 mm (0.28 in) long and purplish-brown, and the keel about 6 mm (0.24 in) long and red. Flowering occurs from late winter to spring and the fruit is an oblong, brown pod 12–20 mm (0.47–0.79 in) long on a stalk 3–6 mm (0.12–0.24 in) long.

== Taxonomy ==
Goodia stenocarpa was first formally described in 2011 by Ian R. Thompson in the journal Muelleria, from specimens collected 31 km (19 mi) west of Norseman in 1999. The specific epithet (stenocarpa) means "narrow-fruited".

== Distribution and habitat ==
This species grows in clay-loam over limestone in woodland between Lake King and Widgiemooltha north of Norseman, in the Coolgardie and Mallee bioregions of inland Western Australia.
