= Goodia macrocarpa =

Scientific classification
- Kingdom: Plantae
- Clade: Tracheophytes
- Clade: Angiosperms
- Clade: Eudicots
- Clade: Rosids
- Order: Fabales
- Family: Fabaceae
- Subfamily: Faboideae
- Genus: Goodia
- Species: G. macrocarpa

Binomial name
- Goodia macrocarpa I.Thomps.

Species of legume

Goodia macrocarpa is a species of flowering plant in the family Fabaceae and is endemic to eastern Australia. It is a shrub with trifoliate leaves, the leaflets narrowly elliptic to elliptic, and bright yellow and red pea-like flowers.

== Description ==
Goodia macrocarpa is a shrub that typically grows to a height of up to about 3 m (9.8 ft) and has softly hairy new growth. Its leaves are trifoliate with narrowly elliptic to elliptic leaflets, 20–30 mm (0.79–1.18 in) long and 15–20 mm (0.59–0.79 in) wide on a petiole about 10 mm (0.39 in) long. The flowers are bright yellow with a red flare at the base, arranged in racemes up to 90 mm (3.5 in) long, each flower on a pedicel 3–10 mm (0.12–0.39 in) long with bracteoles 1–2 mm (0.039–0.079 in) long at the base. The sepals are 4.5–7 mm (0.18–0.28 in) long and joined at the base, the lower three sepal lobes 2–3 mm (0.079–0.118 in) long. The standard petal is 12–16 mm (0.47–0.63 in) long and 15–18 mm (0.59–0.71 in) wide on a stalk 4–5 mm (0.16–0.20 in) long, the wings 12–15 mm (0.47–0.59 in) long and red at the base, and the keel is reddish and about 10–11 mm (0.39–0.43 in) long. Flowering mainly occurs from late winter to early spring and the fruit is an oblong, brown pod 20–40 mm (0.79–1.57 in) long on a stalk 10–15 mm (0.39–0.59 in) long.

== Taxonomy ==
Goodia macrocarpa was first formally described in 2011 by Ian R. Thompson in the journal Muelleria, from specimens collected in the Knorrit State Forest near Wingham by Anthony Bean in 2004. The specific epithet (macrocarpa) means "large-fruited".

== Distribution and habitat ==
This pea grows in tall forest from Tamborine in far south-eastern Queensland to Wingham in north-eastern New South Wales.
