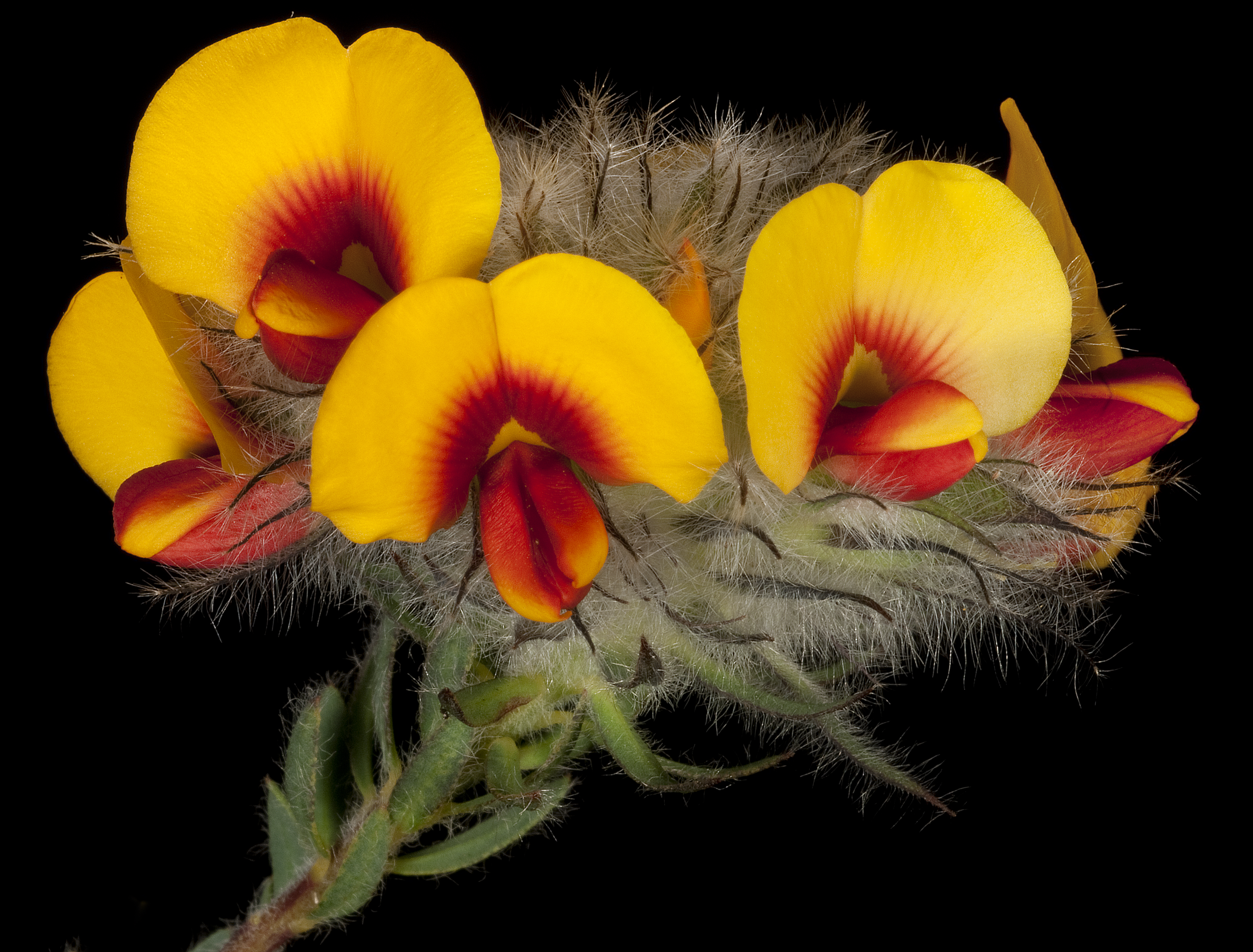

Scientific classification
- Kingdom: Plantae
- Clade: Tracheophytes
- Clade: Angiosperms
- Clade: Eudicots
- Clade: Rosids
- Order: Fabales
- Family: Fabaceae
- Subfamily: Faboideae
- Genus: Urodon
- Species: U. dasyphyllus

Binomial name
- Urodon dasyphyllus Turcz.

Synonyms
- Phyllota lycopodioides S.Moore; Pultenaea lycopodioides (S.Moore) C.A.Gardner; Urodon dasyphyllus var. ovalifolius Ewart & Jean White

= Urodon dasyphyllus =

Species of legume

Urodon dasyphyllus (common name - mop bushpea) is a small shrub in the Fabaceae family, which is endemic to the south west of Western Australia.

== Description ==
Urodon dasyphyllus is a broom-like shrub which may be erect or prostrate, spreading or scrambling. Its stems are terete and hairy and are without glands. The leaves (phylloclades) are simple and alternate with entire margins, and 8–11 mm long by 1.5-2.5 mm wide, on hairy stalks which are 3–6 mm long. There are no apparent stipules even on the youngest leaves. The bracteoles are 8–10 mm long and hairy and persistent. The calyx is hairy with simple hairs, and has no ribs, pustules, or glands. The corolla is 14 to 16 mm long and has no claws. The standard is 11–16 mm long, with no indumentum. The wings are 11–12 mm long, and the keel which is not beaked is 12–13 mm long. There are ten stamens, and the anthers are 0.8 to 1 mm long with the filaments being alternately long and short (6-7.5 mm long). The ovary is hairy or glandular. The style is hairy or glandular towards the base and 10–11 mm long, and circular in cross-section. The fruit is without a stalk (or nearly without a stalk), is round in cross-section and opens at maturity to release the seeds.

It flowers in July, August, September, October and December.

== Distribution ==
It occurs in the IBRA regions of the Yalgoo, the Murchison, the Coolgardie, the Geraldton Sandplains, the Avon Wheatbelt and the Jarrah Forest.

== Taxonomy ==
It was first described in 1853 by Nikolai Turczaninow. The specific epithet, dasyphyllus, comes from two Greek roots/words, dasys ("hairy") and phyllon ("leaf"), to give an adjective which describes the plant as being "hairy-leaved".

== Conservation status ==
It is declared "Not threatened" under Western Australian conservation laws.
