= Peter Good =

Peter Good (date of birth unknown, died 12 June 1803) was the gardener assistant to botanist Robert Brown on the voyage of HMS Investigator under Matthew Flinders, during which the coast of Australia was charted, and various plants collected.

== Biography ==
Good had worked as a foreman at Kew Royal Gardens, during which time he had assisted botanist Christopher Smith in transporting a shipment of English plants to Calcutta. He was working as a kitchen gardener at Wemyss Castle, Scotland, when Joseph Banks offered him the appointment as gardener to Brown, at a salary of £105 a year.

== The voyage ==
Good made an extensive seed collection during the voyage, and also collected plant specimens for both his own and Brown's collections. He died of dysentery in Sydney Cove, and his plant collection was incorporated into Brown's. Brown immensely admired his work ethic, and named the plant genus Goodia in his honour. Banksia goodii (Good's Banksia) is also named after him.

== See also ==
- List of gardener-botanist explorers of the Enlightenment
- European and American voyages of scientific exploration

== Works ==
- Journal of Peter Good, Gardener on Matthew Flinders' Voyage to Terra Australis, 1801–03, Stationery Office Books, September 1981, ISBN 0-11-983258-5

== Reference section ==
=== References ===
- Estensen, Miriam (2002). The life of Matthew Flinders. Allen & Unwin.
