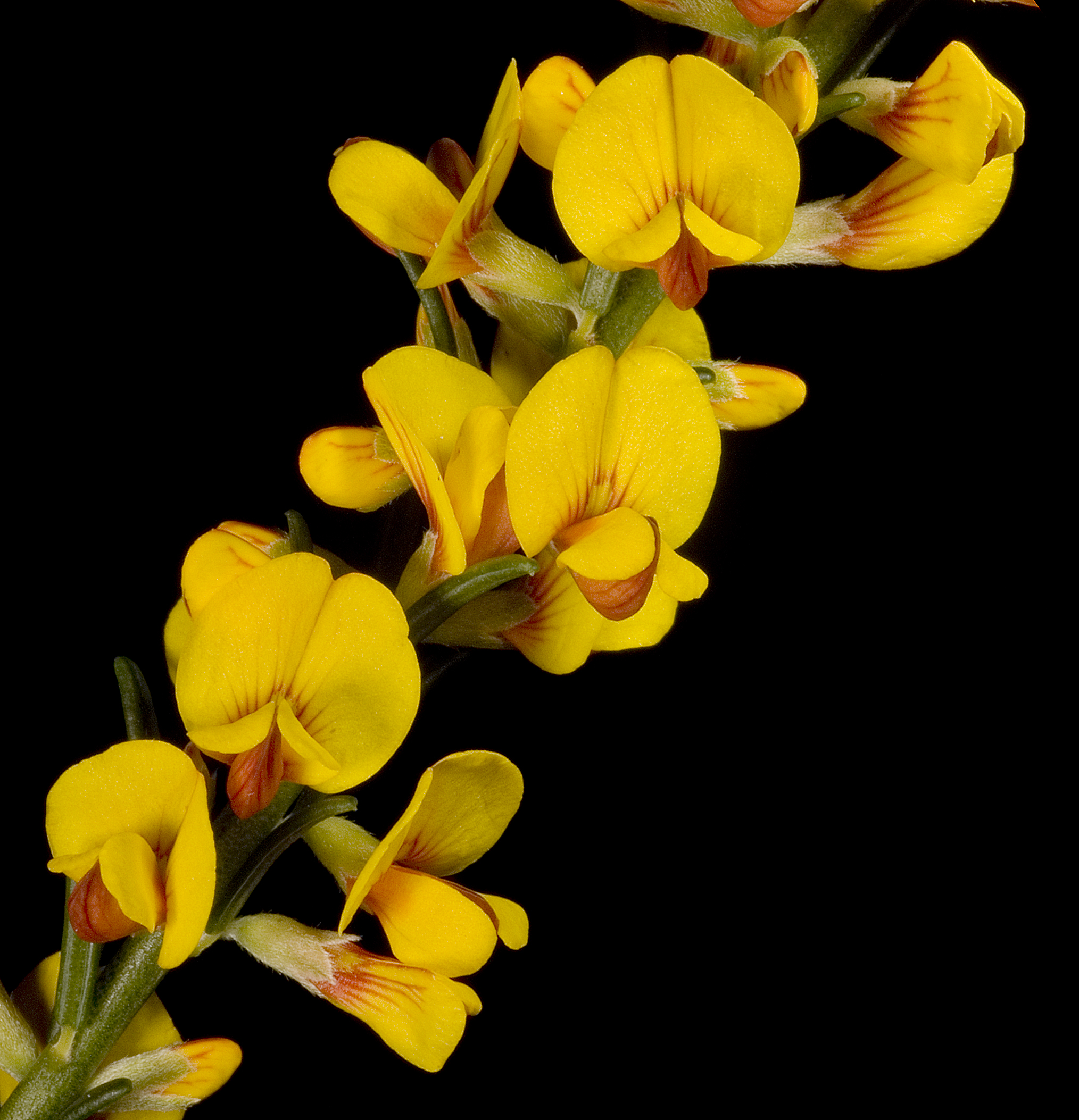

Scientific classification
- Kingdom: Plantae
- Clade: Tracheophytes
- Clade: Angiosperms
- Clade: Eudicots
- Clade: Rosids
- Order: Fabales
- Family: Fabaceae
- Subfamily: Faboideae
- Genus: Aotus
- Species: A. gracillima

Binomial name
- Aotus gracillima Meisn.

Synonyms
- Aotus gracilis Loudon; Aotus gracillima var. unicinata Meisn. Dillwynia gracillima (Meisn.) F.Muell.

= Aotus gracillima =

Species of legume

Aotus gracillima is a shrub in the family Fabaceae, native to Western Australia.

It is a slender upright shrub, growing to heights from 60 cm to 3 m, on peaty sand and sandy clays, in swamps and flats that are wet in the winter. The flowers are yellow and red brown, and seen from August to December.

The species was first described in 1844 by Carl Meissner.
