= Eggs and Bacon Bay =

- Town
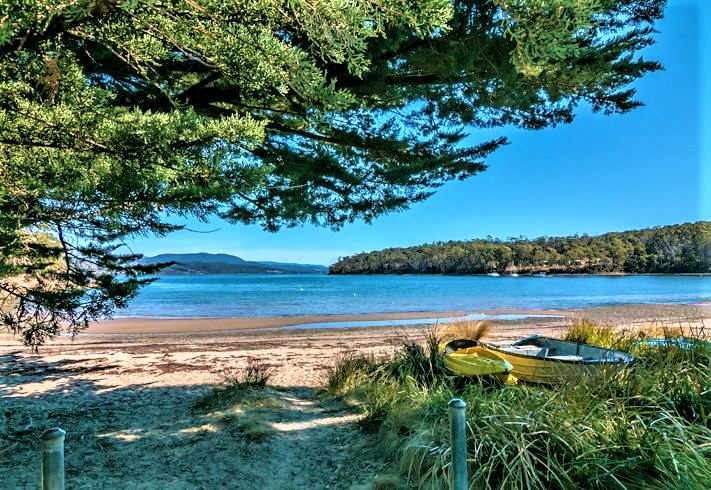
- Eggs and Bacon Bay Beach, the community's main feature

- Coordinates: 43°14′42″S 147°6′6″E
- Country: Australia
- State: Tasmania
- LGA: Huon Valley

Government
  - State electorate: Franklin
  - Federal division: Franklin

Area
  - Total: 1.24 km^{2} (0.48 sq mi)

Population
  - Total: 124 (2021 census)
  - Density: 100.0/km^{2} (259.0/sq mi)
- Time zone: UTC+10 (AEST)
  - Summer (DST): UTC+11 (AEDT)
- Postcode: 7112

Eggs and Bacon Bay (Note: There is no consensus as to whether the A in And is to be capitalised or not. Both variants are used interchangeably by government sources and other sites.) is a community in Tasmania within the local government area of Huon Valley. It is approximately 44 kilometres (27 mi) from the state capital Hobart and 17 kilometres (11 mi) from the nearest township of Cygnet. Eggs and Bacon Bay covers an area of 1.24 square kilometres, and had a population of 124 residents at the 2021 census.

The main geographical feature of the community is Eggs and Bacon Bay Beach. It is 400 metres (1,300 ft) long, 300 metres (980 ft) deep and rated in the lowest Surf Life Saving Australia Beachsafe hazard category (level 1). It has parking, public toilets, picnic table facilities and a boat ramp.

The unusual name is said to be based on the yellow and streaky red eggs-and-bacon flowers that grow in the area from the pea family of Fabaceae. An alternative, though likely untrue, story is that Lady Jane Franklin, wife of the 18th century governor John Franklin, ate bacon and eggs there around 1840.
