= Butter-and-eggs =

Butter-and-eggs may refer to:

- Linaria vulgaris, a species of plant native to Europe and northern Asia
- Triphysaria eriantha, a species of plant native to North America
- Butter and Egg Days Parade, held annually in Petaluma, California

== See also ==
- Butter (disambiguation)
- Eggs-and-bacon (disambiguation)
