= Paragoodia =

Scientific classification
- Kingdom: Plantae
- Clade: Tracheophytes
- Clade: Angiosperms
- Clade: Eudicots
- Clade: Rosids
- Order: Fabales
- Family: Fabaceae
- Subfamily: Faboideae
- Clade: Mirbelioids
- Genus: Paragoodia; I.Thomps. (2011)
- Species: P. crenulata

Binomial name
- Paragoodia crenulata (A.T.Lee) I.Thomps. (2011)

Synonyms
- Muelleranthus crenulatus A.T.Lee (1973)

Genus of legumes

Paragoodia crenulata is a species of flowering plant in the family Fabaceae. It is an herbaceous perennial native to Southwest Australia. It is the only member of the genus Paragoodia. The genus belongs to subfamily Faboideae.
