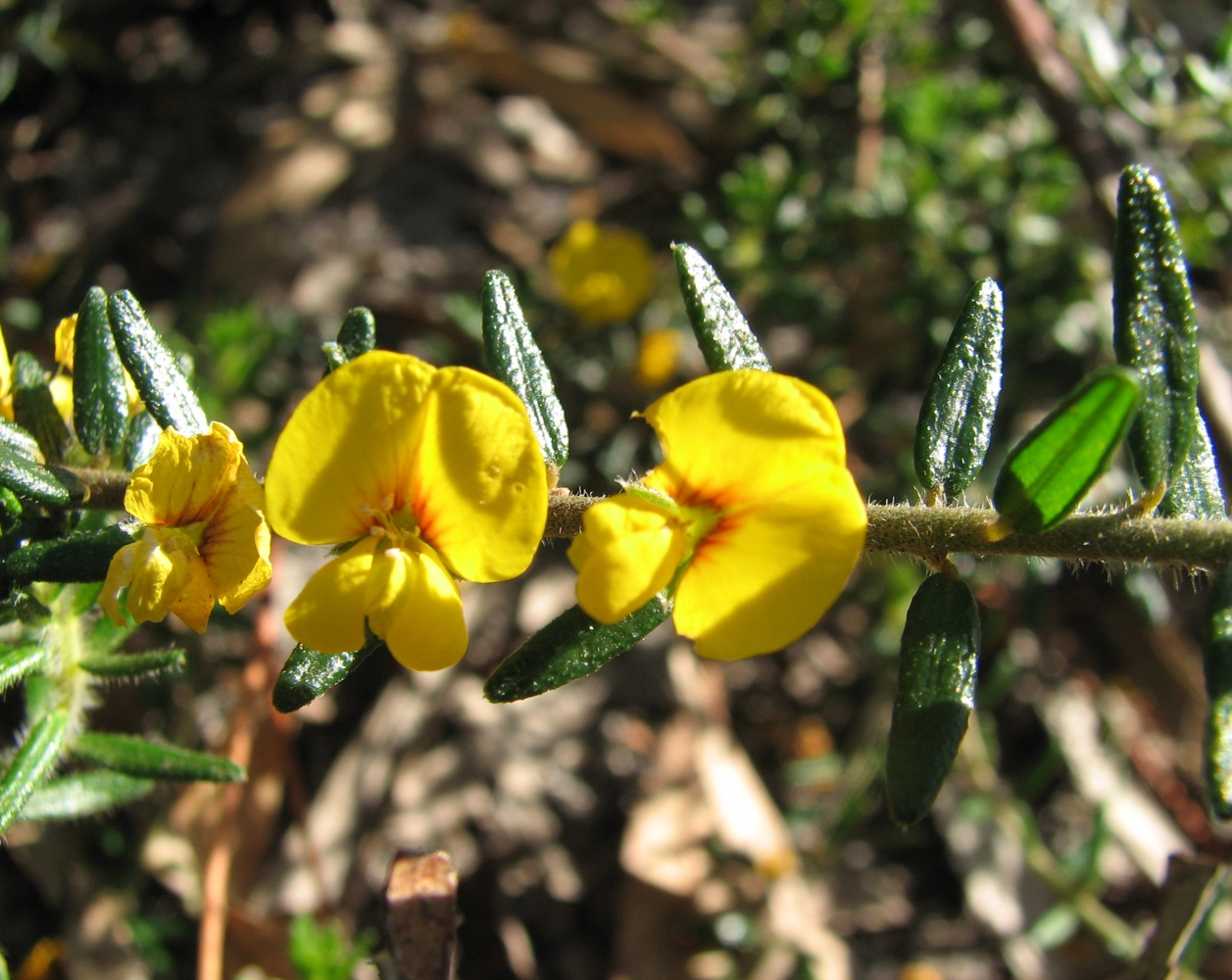

Scientific classification
- Kingdom: Plantae
- Clade: Embryophytes
- Clade: Tracheophytes
- Clade: Spermatophytes
- Clade: Angiosperms
- Clade: Eudicots
- Clade: Rosids
- Order: Fabales
- Family: Fabaceae
- Subfamily: Faboideae
- Genus: Aotus
- Species: A. ericoides

Binomial name
- Aotus ericoides (Vent.) Don

Synonyms
- Aotus ferruginea Labill.; Aotus villosa Sm.; Aotus villosa var. ericoides (Vent.) DC.; Aotus villosa var. ferruginea (Labill.) DC.; Aotus virgata Sieber ex DC.; Daviesia ericoides (Vent.) Pers.; Pultenaea ericoides Vent.

= Aotus ericoides =

Common aotus

Species of legume

Aotus ericoides, also known as common aotus or golden pea, is a shrub in the family Fabaceae. It flowers in leaf axils in spring and has yellow pea flowers with splotches of red. It is endemic to eastern Australia.

== Description ==
Aotus ericoides is a variable shrub that may grow up to 2 m (6 ft 7 in) high. The stems are often covered in short, matted, rusty or greyish coloured hairs. The leaves are whorls of 3 or more either growing alternate or opposite. The leaves vary in shape, they may be egg-shaped, broad at the base narrowing to the apex or long and narrow and about 6–20 mm (0.24–0.79 in) long and 1–5 mm (0.039–0.197 in) wide on a stalk 1–2 mm (0.039–0.079 in) long. The leaf edge may be curved backwards or rolled under. The leaf upper surface has either small wart-like protuberances or smooth with occasional long hairs. The single yellow pea flower has a red-orange band around a yellow centre and bright yellow wings and keel. The flower bracts are about 2 mm (0.079 in) long, the pedicels 2 mm (0.079 in) long. The calyx edge has pointed teeth and is covered with long, soft hairs about 3 mm (0.12 in) long. The seed capsule is a swollen firm, egg-shaped pod and covered with long soft hairs. Flowering occurs late winter to spring in upper leaf axils.

== Taxonomy and naming ==
Common aotus was first formally described in 1803 by Étienne Pierre Ventenat who gave it the name Pultanaea ericoides and the description was published in Jardin de la Malmaison. In 1832 the Scottish botanist George Don changed the name to Aotus ericoides and the description was published in A General History of Dichlamydeous Plants. The specific epithet (ericoides) refers to the similarity to a species of Erica. The suffix - oides is a Latin ending meaning "likeness".

== Distribution and habitat ==
It occurs in heathland and dry sclerophyll forests on sandstone in Queensland, South Australia, Victoria and Tasmania. In New South Wales it is found on the coast and Southern Highlands.
