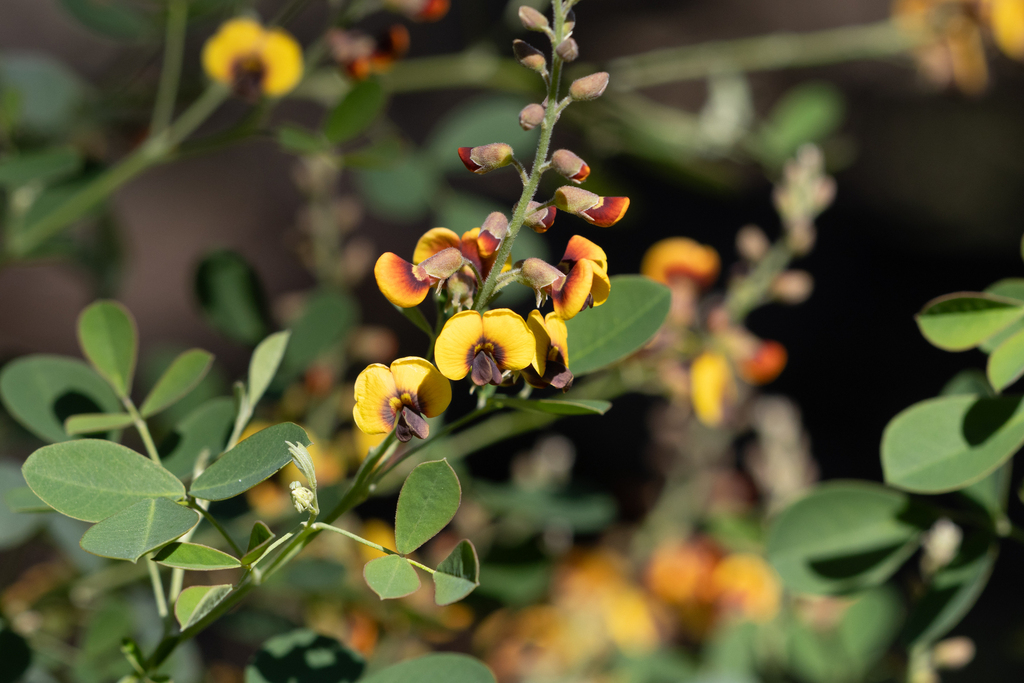
- In Onkaparinga River National Park

Scientific classification
- Kingdom: Plantae
- Clade: Tracheophytes
- Clade: Angiosperms
- Clade: Eudicots
- Clade: Rosids
- Order: Fabales
- Family: Fabaceae
- Subfamily: Faboideae
- Genus: Goodia
- Species: G. medicaginea

Binomial name
- Goodia medicaginea F.Muell.

= Goodia medicaginea =

Species of legume

Goodia medicaginea, commonly known as western golden tip, is a species of flowering plant in the family Fabaceae and is endemic to southern continental Australia. It is a shrub with trifoliate leaves, the leaflets narrowly egg-shaped with the narrower end towards the base, and mostly yellow, pea-like flowers with red to purplish-black or brown markings.

== Description ==
Goodia medicaginea is a shrub that typically grows to a height of up to 1.5 m (4 ft 11 in). Its leaves are trifoliate with egg-shaped leaflets, the narrower end towards the base, 4–32 mm (0.16–1.26 in) long and 2–20 mm (0.079–0.787 in) wide on a petiole 5–25 mm (0.20–0.98 in) long. The leaves are more or less glabrous and dull bluish green when young. The flowers are mostly yellow with red to purplish-black or brown markings, arranged in racemes 10–40 mm (0.39–1.57 in) long, each flower 6–10.5 mm (0.24–0.41 in) long on a pedicel up to 5 mm (0.20 in) long. The sepals are 3.0–5.3 mm (0.12–0.21 in) long and joined at the base, the lower three sepal lobes shorter than the sepal tube at maturity. Flowering occurs in August and September and the fruit is an egg-shaped to oblong pod 12–23 mm (0.47–0.91 in) long.

== Taxonomy ==
Goodia medicaginea was first formally described in 1858 by Ferdinand von Mueller in his Fragmenta Phytographiae Australiae. The specific epithet (medicaginea) means "like Medicago".

== Distribution and habitat ==
Western golden tip occurs in Western Australia, South Australia, Victoria and New South Wales. In Western Australia it grows in granitic soils on granite rocks in the south-west, in Victoria at scattered locations in the southern half of the state, and in New South Wales in mallee communities south from Nymagee.
