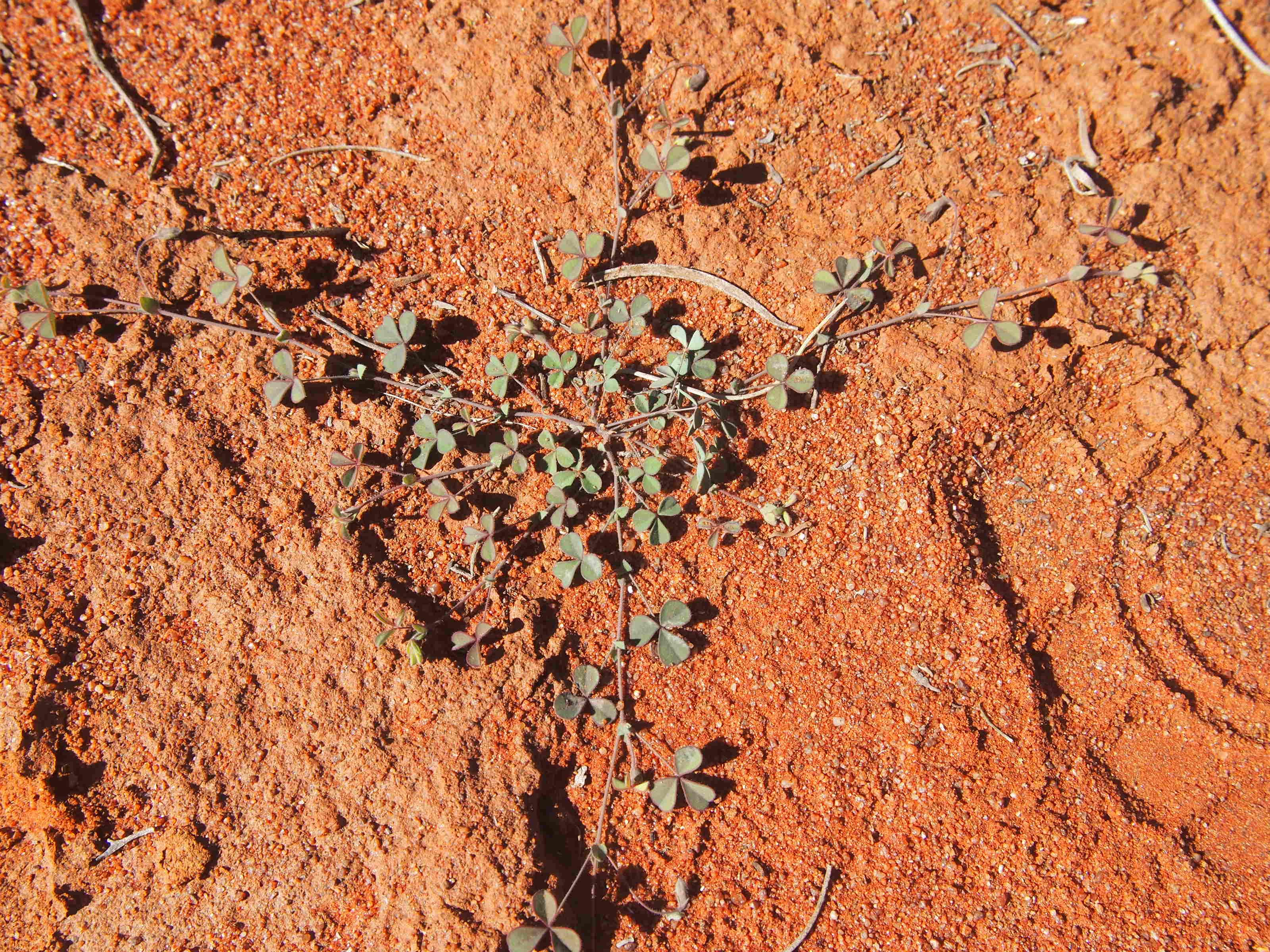
- Muelleranthus stipularis

Scientific classification
- Kingdom: Plantae
- Clade: Embryophytes
- Clade: Tracheophytes
- Clade: Spermatophytes
- Clade: Angiosperms
- Clade: Eudicots
- Clade: Rosids
- Order: Fabales
- Family: Fabaceae
- Subfamily: Faboideae
- Clade: Mirbelioids
- Genus: Muelleranthus; Hutch. (1964)

Species
- four; see text

= Muelleranthus =

Genus of legumes

Muelleranthus is a genus of flowering plants in the legume family, Fabaceae. It includes four species of herbs and shrubs native to Australia. Habitats include subtropical, mediterranean, and temperate climate shrubland, mostly on sandy soils in the central arid and semi-arid Eremaean region of the continent. It is often associated with Triodia tussock grasses. It belongs to the subfamily Faboideae.

== Species ==
Muelleranthus comprises the following species:

- Muelleranthus obovatus I.Thomps.
- Muelleranthus parvalatus I.Thomps.
- Muelleranthus stipularis (J.M.Black) A.T.Lee
- Muelleranthus trifoliolatus (F.Muell.) A.T.Lee
