= Latrobea =

Scientific classification
- Kingdom: Plantae
- Clade: Tracheophytes
- Clade: Angiosperms
- Clade: Eudicots
- Clade: Rosids
- Order: Fabales
- Family: Fabaceae
- Subfamily: Faboideae
- Clade: Mirbelioids
- Genus: Latrobea; Meisn. (1848)

Species
- 8; see text

Synonyms
- Leptocytisus Meisn. (1848)

Genus of legumes

Latrobea is a genus of flowering plants in the legume family, Fabaceae. It includes eight species of shrubs endemic to Southwest Australia. Typical habitats include forest, woodland, and heathland on sandy soils and swampy areas in higher-rainfall areas of the far southwest. The genus belongs to the subfamily Faboideae. The plant is named after Charles Joseph La Trobe.

== Species ==
Latrobea comprises the following species:

- Latrobea brunonis (Benth.) Meissner
- Latrobea colophon Chappill & C.F.Wilkins
- Latrobea diosmifolia (Benth.) Benth.
- Latrobea genistoides (Meissner) Meissner
- Latrobea hirtella (Turcz.) Benth.
- Latrobea pinnaculum Chappill & C.F.Wilkins
- Latrobea recurva Chappill & C.F.Wilkins
- Latrobea tenella (Meissner) Benth.
