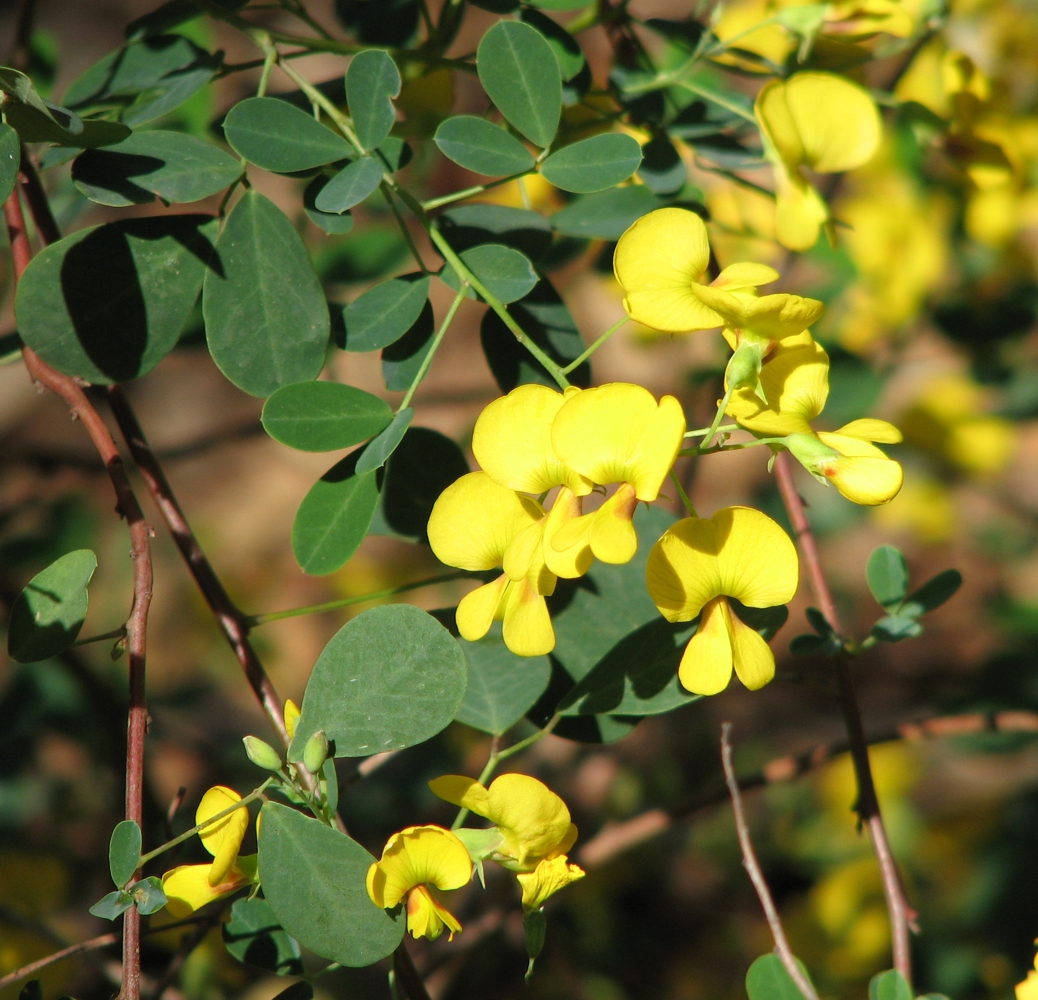
- Goodia lotifolia in Maranoa Gardens

Scientific classification
- Kingdom: Plantae
- Clade: Tracheophytes
- Clade: Angiosperms
- Clade: Eudicots
- Clade: Rosids
- Order: Fabales
- Family: Fabaceae
- Subfamily: Faboideae
- Clade: Mirbelioids
- Genus: Goodia; Salisb.

Species
- See text

= Goodia =

Genus of legumes

Goodia is a genus of six species of flowering plants in the family Fabaceae, and is endemic to Australia. Plants in the genus Goodia are shrubs with trifoliate leaves. The flowers are arranged in racemes, the sepals with two "lips", the standard petal more or less circular and the fruit is a flattened pod.

== Description ==
Plants in the genus Goodia are shrubs with trifoliate leaves, the leaves with a petiole with stipules at the base but that soon fall off. The flowers are arranged in racemes, each flower with a bract and two bracteoles at the base, but all fall off as the flower opens. The sepals are joined at the base with two "lips", the upper lip with two broad lobes and the lower lip with three narrow teeth. The petals are yellow with red, green or purplish markings, the standard petal more or less circular and the wings narrow. The fruit a flattened pod on a long stalk.

== Taxonomy ==
The genus Goodia was first formally described in 1806 by Richard Anthony Salisbury in The Paradisus Londinensis and the first species he described was Goodia lotifolia.. The genus name, Goodia honours Peter Good.

=== Species list ===
The following is a list of Goodia species accepted by the Australian Plant Census as of September 2021:

- Goodia lotifolia Salisb. – golden tip, clover tree (Qld., N.S.W., A.C.T., Vic., Tas.)
- Goodia macrocarpa I.Thomps. (Qld., N.S.W.)
- Goodia medicaginea F.Muell. – western golden-tip (W.A., S.A., N.S.W., Vic.)
- Goodia parviflora I.Thomps. (Qld.)
- Goodia pubescens Sims – golden tip (Vic., Tas.)
- Goodia stenocarpa I.Thomps. (W.A.)
