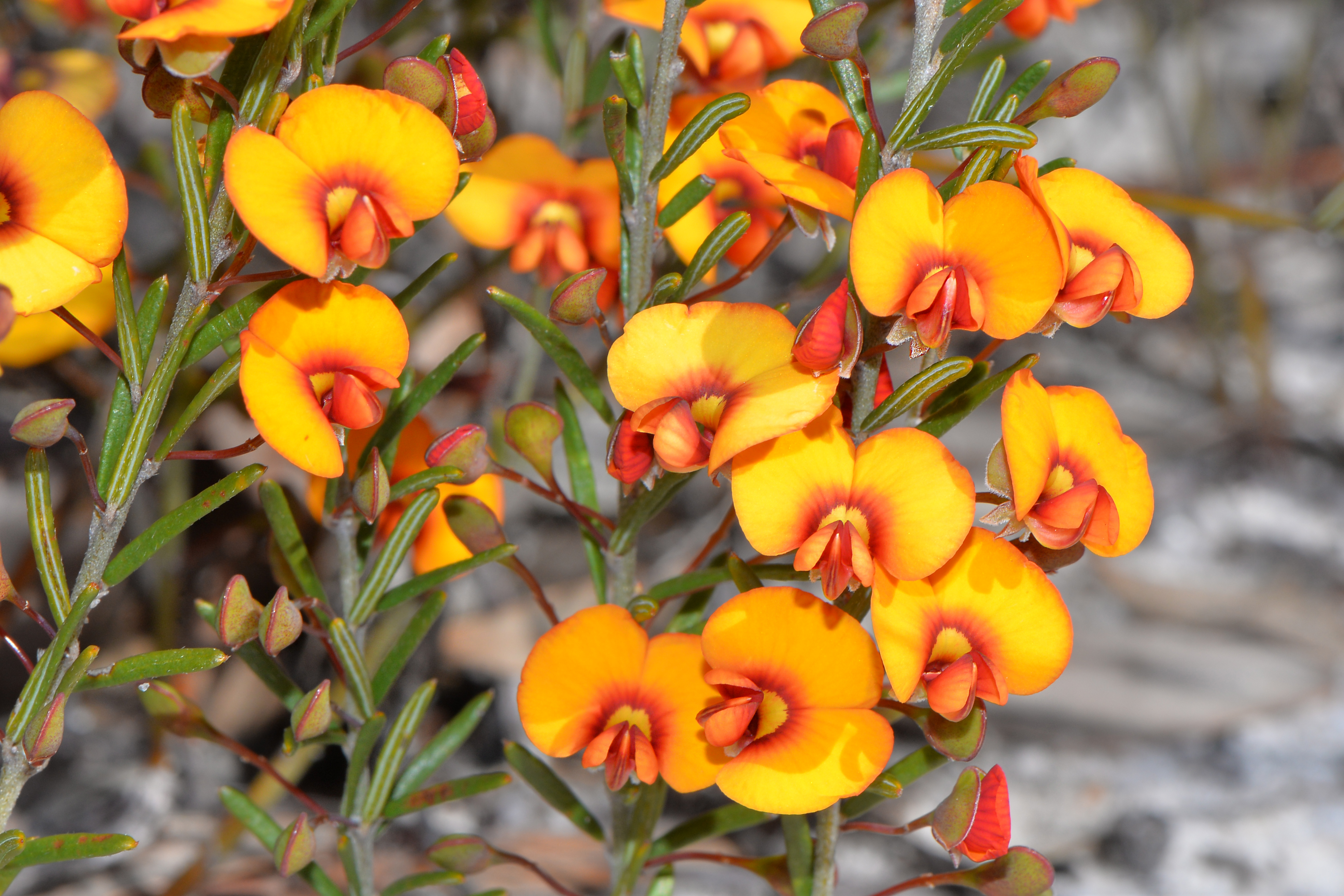

Scientific classification
- Kingdom: Plantae
- Clade: Tracheophytes
- Clade: Angiosperms
- Clade: Eudicots
- Clade: Rosids
- Order: Fabales
- Family: Fabaceae
- Subfamily: Faboideae
- Clade: Mirbelioids
- Genus: Euchilopsis; F. Muell.
- Species: E. linearis

Binomial name
- Euchilopsis linearis (Benth.) F.Muell. (1882)

Synonyms
- Euchilus linearis Benth. (1837); Sphaerolobium euchilus Benth. (1864); Sphaerolobium lineare (Benth.) Druce (1917)

= Euchilopsis =

Genus of legumes

Euchilopsis linearis is a species of flowering plant in the family Fabaceae. It belongs to the subfamily Faboideae. It is the only member of the genus Euchilopsis. It is a shrub endemic to Southwest Australia.
