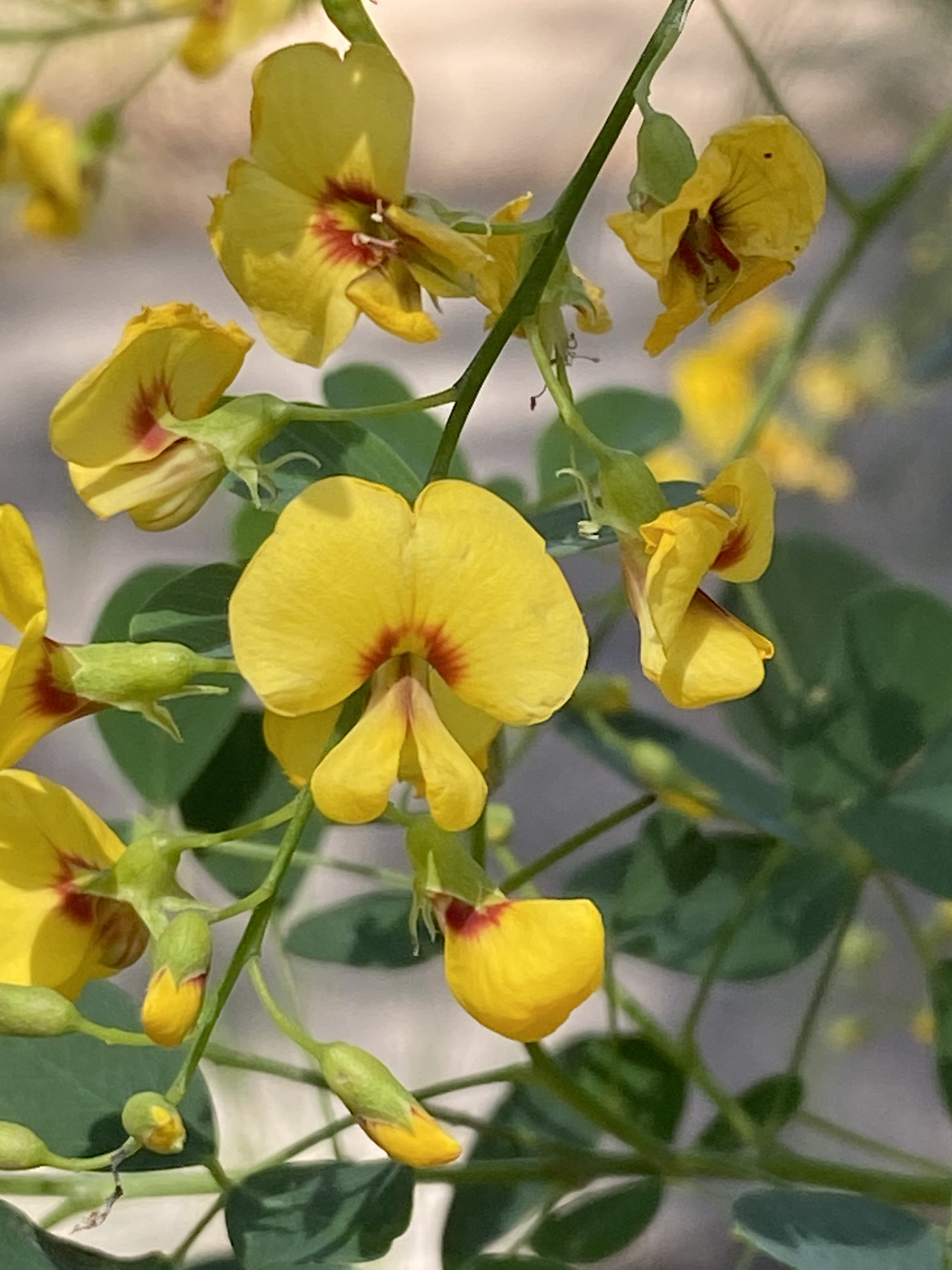

Scientific classification
- Kingdom: Plantae
- Clade: Tracheophytes
- Clade: Angiosperms
- Clade: Eudicots
- Clade: Rosids
- Order: Fabales
- Family: Fabaceae
- Subfamily: Faboideae
- Genus: Goodia
- Species: G. lotifolia

Binomial name
- Goodia lotifolia Salisb.

= Goodia lotifolia =

Species of legume

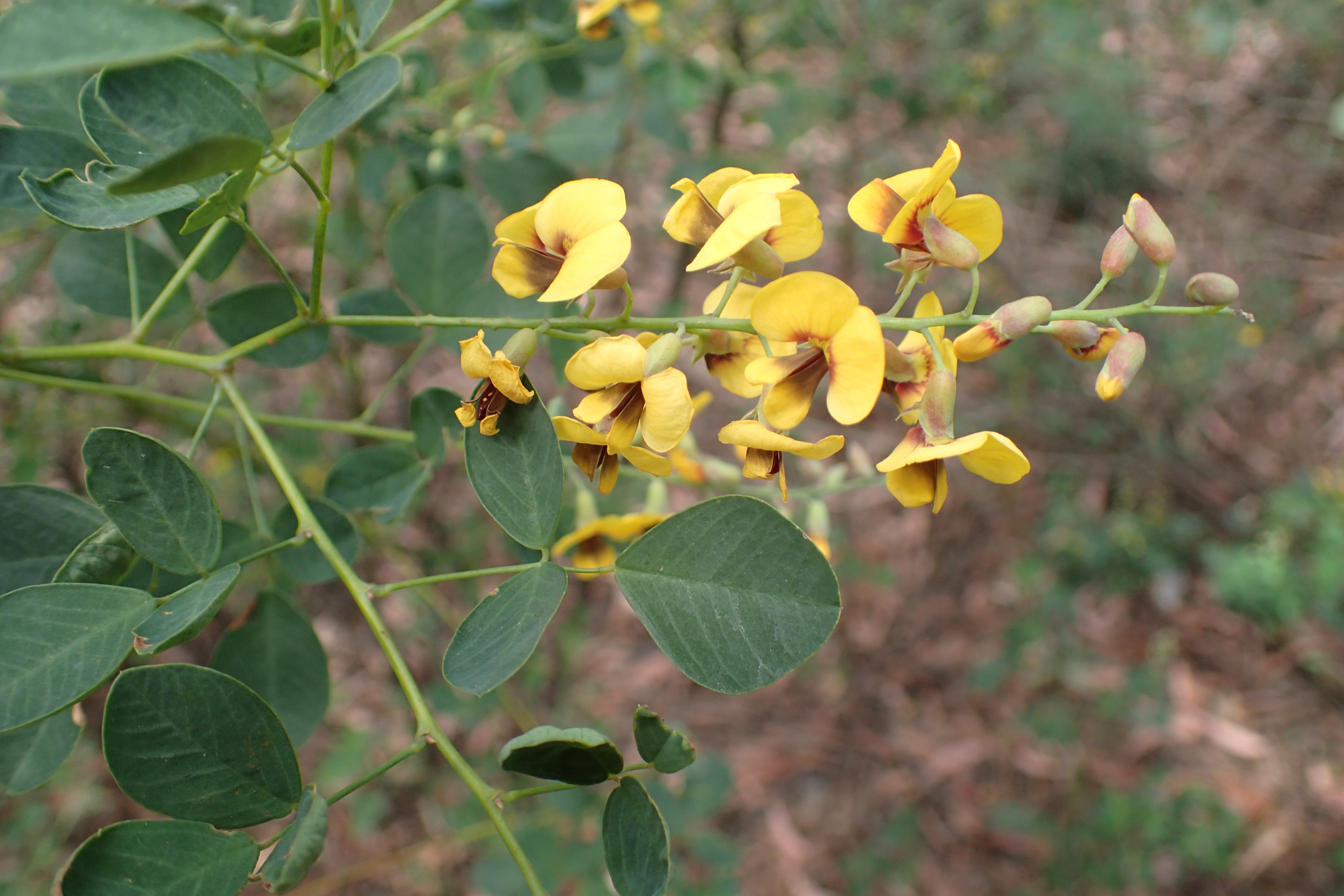
Leaves

Goodia lotifolia, commonly known as golden tip or clover tree, is a species of flowering plant in the family Fabaceae and is endemic to eastern Australia. It is a sometimes tall shrub with trifoliate leaves, the leaflets narrowly egg-shaped with the narrower end towards the base, and bright yellow, pea-like flowers with red or brown markings.

== Description ==
Goodia lotifolia is a sometimes tall shrub that typically grows to a height of up to 4 m (13 ft). Its leaves are trifoliate with egg-shaped leaflets, the narrower end towards the base, or elliptic, 10–30 mm (0.39–1.18 in) long and 6–30 mm (0.24–1.18 in) wide on a petiole 5–30 mm (0.20–1.18 in) long. The flowers are yellow with red or brown markings, arranged in racemes 40–120 mm (1.6–4.7 in) long, each flower 4–6 mm (0.16–0.24 in) long on a pedicel 3–12 mm (0.12–0.47 in) long. The sepals are 3.5–7 mm (0.14–0.28 in) long and joined at the base, the lower three sepal lobes about as long as the sepal tube. Flowering occurs from September to November and the fruit is an egg-shaped to oblong pod 16–38 mm (0.63–1.50 in) long.

== Taxonomy ==
Goodia lotifolia was first formally described in 1806 by Richard Anthony Salisbury in Paradisus Londinensis. The specific epithet (lotifolia) means "lotus-leaved".

== Distribution and habitat ==
Golden tip grows in sheltered valleys, in forest or on the margins of rainforest and occurs from south-eastern Queensland, through eastern New South Wales, the south-eastern half of Victoria and in Tasmania where it is common.
