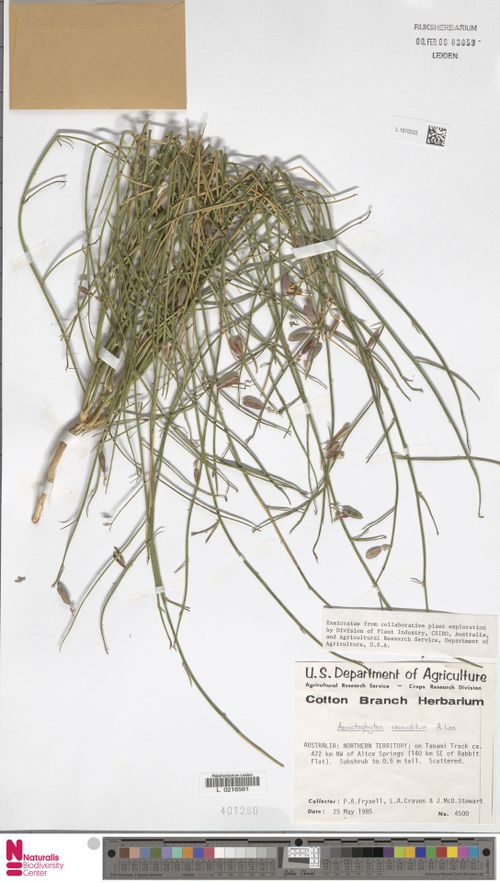
- Aenictophyton reconditum

Scientific classification
- Kingdom: Plantae
- Clade: Tracheophytes
- Clade: Angiosperms
- Clade: Eudicots
- Clade: Rosids
- Order: Fabales
- Family: Fabaceae
- Subfamily: Faboideae
- Clade: Mirbelioids
- Genus: Aenictophyton; A.T.Lee (1973)

= Aenictophyton =

Genus of legumes

Aenictophyton is a genus of flowering plants in the legume family, Fabaceae. It belongs to the subfamily Faboideae. It contains two species which are endemic to Australia.

It was first described in 1973 by Alma Theodora Lee.

== Species ==
Two species are accepted:

- Aenictophyton anomalum (F.Muell.) I.Thomps.
- Aenictophyton reconditum A.T.Lee
