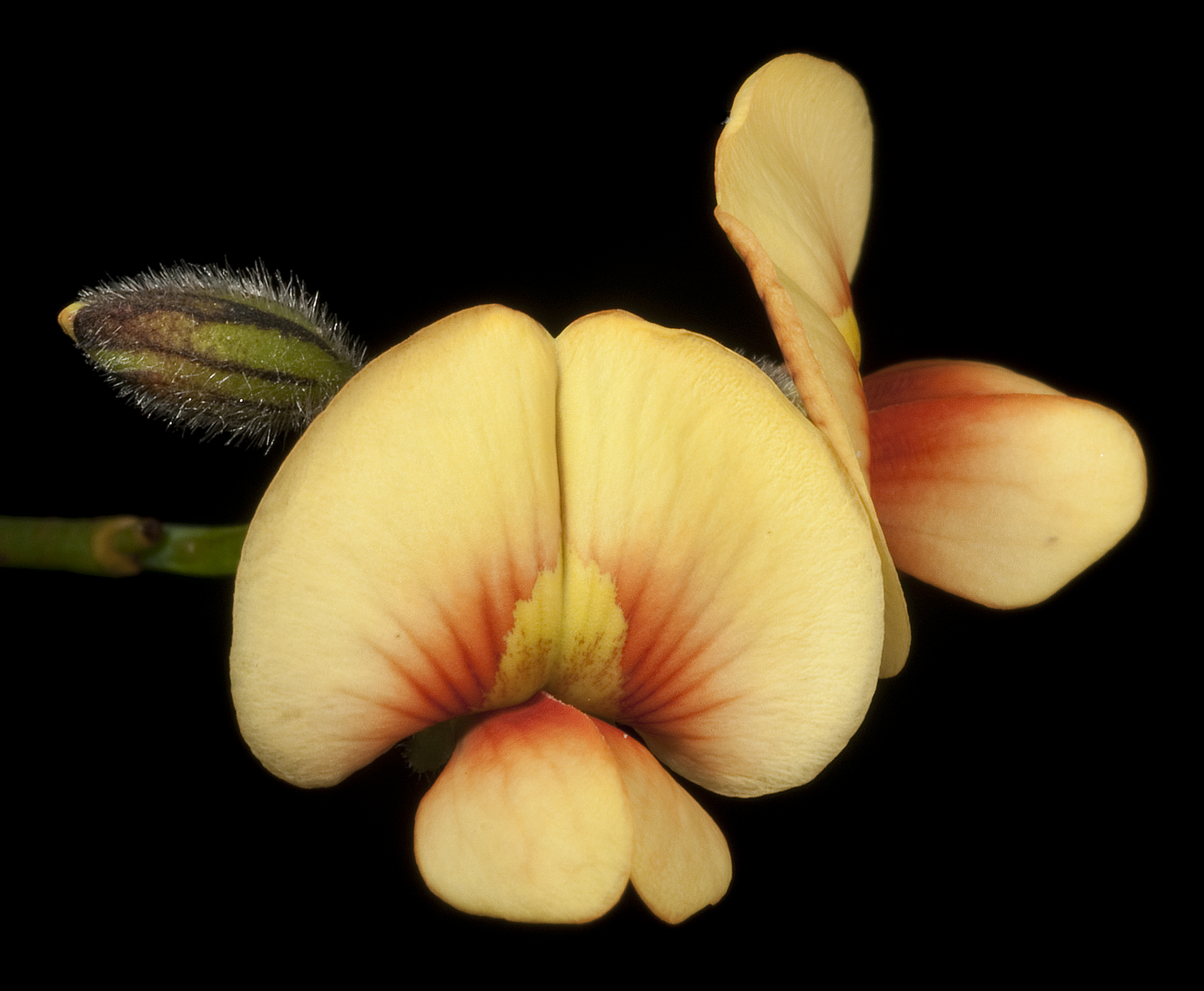

Scientific classification
- Kingdom: Plantae
- Clade: Tracheophytes
- Clade: Angiosperms
- Clade: Eudicots
- Clade: Rosids
- Order: Fabales
- Family: Fabaceae
- Subfamily: Faboideae
- Clade: Mirbelioids
- Genus: Erichsenia; Hemsl.
- Species: E. uncinata

Binomial name
- Erichsenia uncinata Hemsl.

= Erichsenia =

Genus of legumes

Erichsenia uncinata is a species of flowering plants in the family Fabaceae. It belongs to the subfamily Faboideae. It is the only member of the genus Erichsenia. It is a subshrub native to Southwest Australia.
