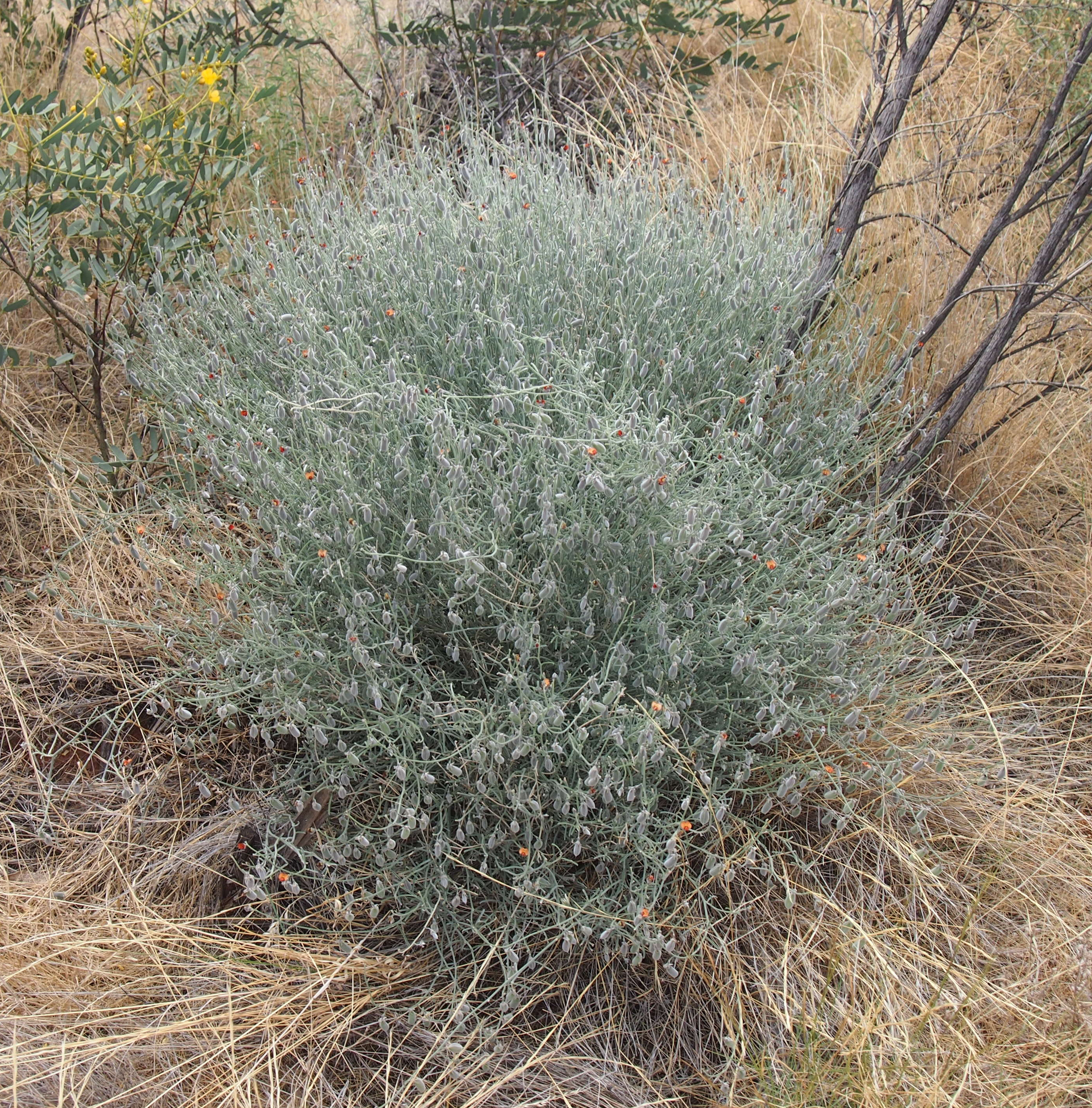
- Isotropis wheeleri

Scientific classification
- Kingdom: Plantae
- Clade: Tracheophytes
- Clade: Angiosperms
- Clade: Eudicots
- Clade: Rosids
- Order: Fabales
- Family: Fabaceae
- Subfamily: Faboideae
- Clade: Mirbelioids
- Genus: Isotropis; Benth.

species
- See text.

= Isotropis =

Genus of legumes

Isotropis is a genus of flowering plants in the family Fabaceae. The genus is endemic to Australia.

== Species ==
Isotropis comprises the following species:

- Isotropis atropurpurea F.Muell. – Poison Sage
- Isotropis browniae Jobson
- Isotropis canescens F.Muell.
- Isotropis centralis Maconochie
- Isotropis cuneifolia (Sm.) Heynh. — Granny Bonnets
- Isotropis drummondii Meisn. — Lamb Poison
- Isotropis faucicola Jobson
- Isotropis filicaulis Benth.
- Isotropis foliosa Crisp
- Isotropis forrestii F.Muell.
- Isotropis iophyta Wege & R.W.Davis
- Isotropis juncea Turcz. — Slender Lamb Poison
- Isotropis parviflora Benth.
- Isotropis petrensis R.W.Davis & Wege
- Isotropis wheeleri Benth.
- Isotropis winneckei F.Muell.

=== Formerly placed here ===
- Isotropis argentea Ewart & Morrison is a synonym of Crotalaria juncea
