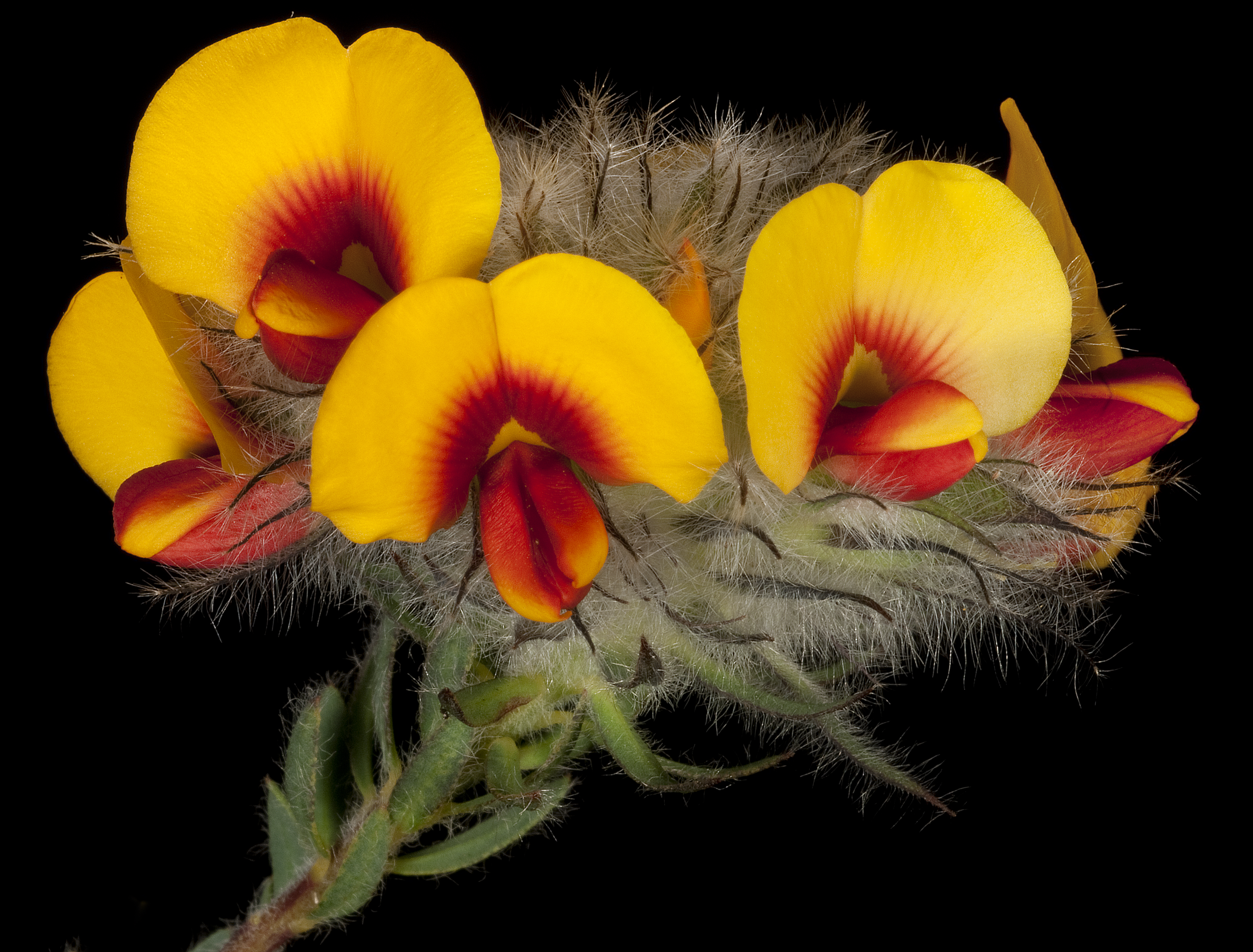
- Urodon dasyphyllus

Scientific classification
- Kingdom: Plantae
- Clade: Tracheophytes
- Clade: Angiosperms
- Clade: Eudicots
- Clade: Rosids
- Order: Fabales
- Family: Fabaceae
- Subfamily: Faboideae
- Clade: Mirbelioids
- Genus: Urodon; Turcz. (1849)

Species
- Urodon capitatus Turcz.; Urodon dasyphyllus Turcz.

= Urodon (plant) =

Genus of legumes

Urodon is a small genus from the family Fabaceae native to southwestern Australia. It includes two species of shrubs which grow in forest, woodland, and heathland.

== Species ==
- Urodon capitatus
- Urodon dasyphyllus
