= Ptychosema =

Scientific classification
- Kingdom: Plantae
- Clade: Tracheophytes
- Clade: Angiosperms
- Clade: Eudicots
- Clade: Rosids
- Order: Fabales
- Family: Fabaceae
- Subfamily: Faboideae
- Genus: Ptychosema; Benth. ex Lindl. (1839)
- Species: P. pusillum

Binomial name
- Ptychosema pusillum Benth. (1839)

Genus of legumes

Ptychosema is a genus of flowering plants in the legume family, Fabaceae. It includes a single species, Ptychosema pusillum, an herbaceous perennial native to desert and dry shrubland in central and western Western Australia. It belongs to the subfamily Faboideae.
