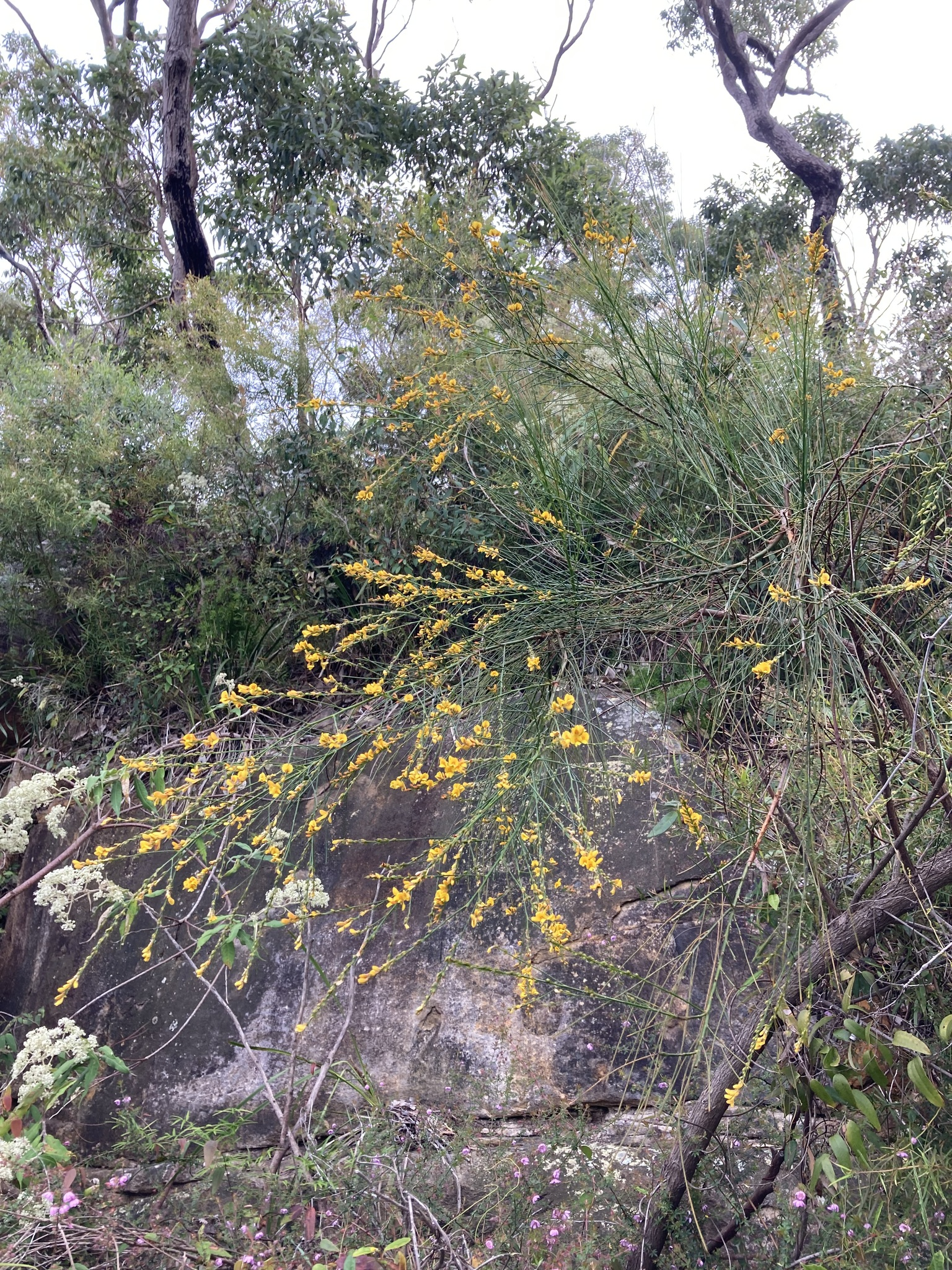

Scientific classification
- Kingdom: Plantae
- Clade: Tracheophytes
- Clade: Angiosperms
- Clade: Eudicots
- Clade: Rosids
- Order: Fabales
- Family: Fabaceae
- Subfamily: Faboideae
- Clade: Mirbelioids
- Genus: Viminaria; Sm.
- Species: V. juncea

Binomial name
- Viminaria juncea (Schrad.) Hoffmanns.

= Viminaria =

Genus of plants

Viminaria juncea is the single species (Note: There are three additional unresolved species names: Viminaria denudata Sm., Viminaria lateriflora Link, and Viminaria preissii Meisn.) in the genus Viminaria endemic to Australia. The genus is in the pea family Fabaceae. It is colloquially known as native broom after its resemblance to the related European broom plants. The Noongar peoples know the plant as koweda.

== Taxonomy ==
Originally described in 1795 by Schrader as Sophora juncea, it was given its current binomial name by Hoffmannsegg in 1824. The genus name is derived from the Latin vimineus "switch", and the species name from Latin juncus "rush", hence "rush-like". Alternate names include golden spray, native broom and swishbush.

== Description ==
Native broom grows as an erect or weeping shrub 1.5–6 m (4.9–19.7 ft) high and 1–2.5 m (3.3–8.2 ft) wide. It has a smooth trunk and ascending branches while the minor branchlets often droop. The long and thin leaves are essentially petioles and measure 3–25 cm (1.2–9.8 in) in length.

Flowering occurs from September to January, the flowers growing on racemes to about 25 cm (10 in) in length. Measuring 0.8 cm (0.31 in) in diameter, they are yellow with an orange corolla and are typically pea-shaped. They are followed by small pods containing single seeds.

== Distribution ==
The preferred habitat is swampy areas near the coast across southern Australia, from the vicinity of Geraldton in Western Australia southwards to Esperance, and in the east in coastal Queensland, New South Wales, Victoria, and South Australia.

== Cultivation ==
Native broom is a fast-growing plant in the garden, but can lose vigor once about 5 or 10 years old. It prefers an acidic to neutral soil with ample moisture and is hardy to temperatures of −4 °C. Plants grown from seed are sturdier than cutting-grown specimens.
