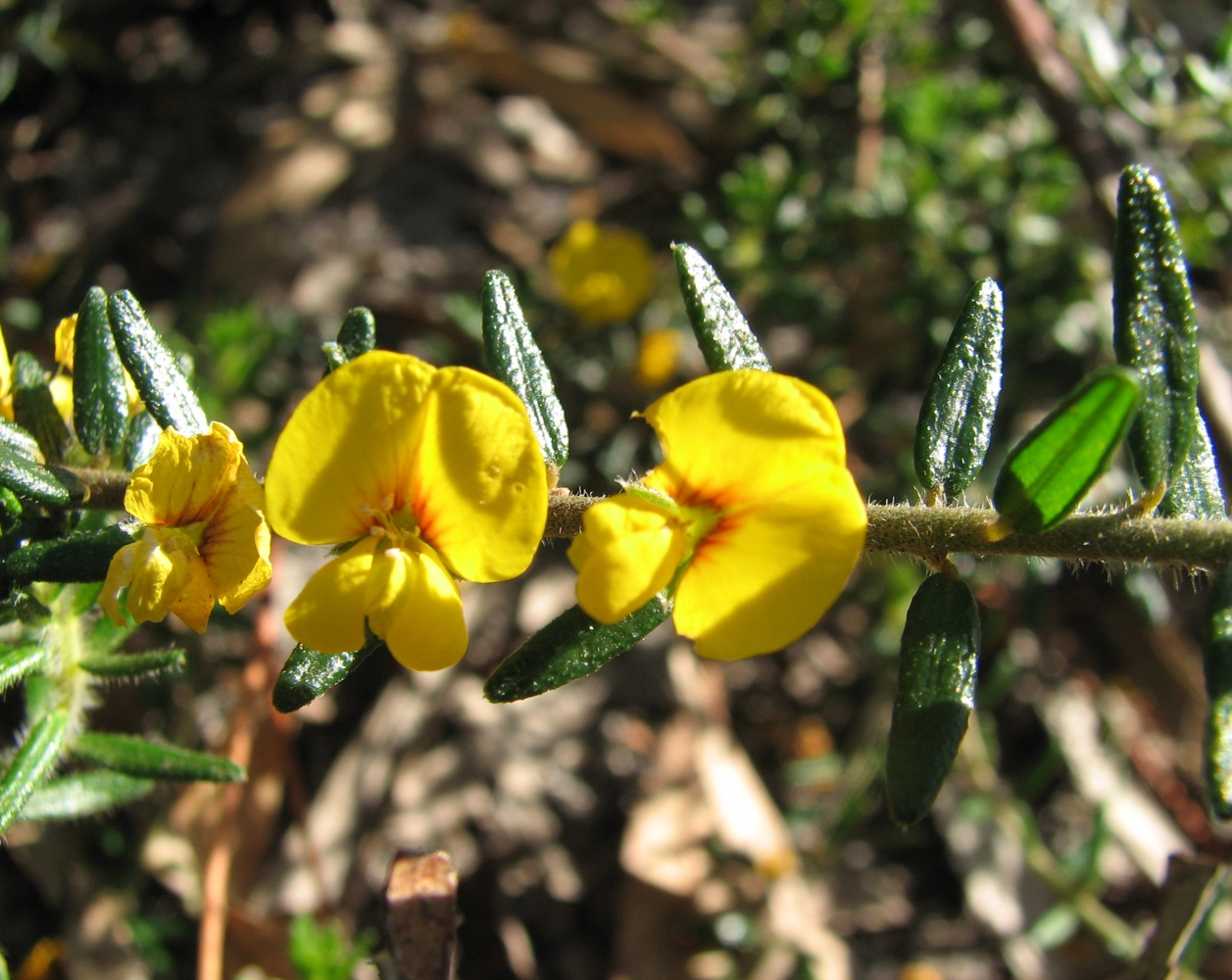
- Aotus ericoides

Scientific classification
- Kingdom: Plantae
- Clade: Tracheophytes
- Clade: Angiosperms
- Clade: Eudicots
- Clade: Rosids
- Order: Fabales
- Family: Fabaceae
- Subfamily: Faboideae
- Clade: Mirbelioids
- Genus: Aotus; Sm.

Species
- See text

= Aotus (plant) =

Golden pea

Genus of legumes

Aotus is an Australian genus of flowering plants, within the legume family Fabaceae. Aotus species, together with other species of the tribe Mirbelieae, are often called golden peas because of their distinctive small yellow flowers. They are endemic to Australia, occurring in all states except the Northern Territory. Aotus are evergreen species. Some are widely cultivated by gardeners for their ornamental value.

== Species ==
Aotus comprises the following species:

- Aotus carinata Meissner
- Aotus cordifolia Benth.
- Aotus ericoides (Vent.) G.Don
- Aotus genistoides Turcz.
- Aotus gracillima Meissner
- Aotus intermedia Meissner
- Aotus lanigera Benth.
- Aotus mollis Benth.
- Aotus passerinoides Meissner
- Aotus phylicoides Benth.
- Aotus procumbens Meissner
- Aotus subglauca Blakeley & McKie
- Aotus subspinescens (Benth.) Crisp
- Aotus tietkensii F.Muell.

== Species names with uncertain taxonomic status ==
The status of the following species is unresolved:

- Aotus coccinea Dum.Cours.
- Aotus diffusa C.A. Gardner
- Aotus dillwynioides Meisn.
- Aotus drummondii T.Moore
- Aotus franklandii Chappill & C.F.Wilkins
- Aotus gracilis Loudon
- Aotus lanea Chappill & C.F.Wilkins
- Aotus preissii Meisn.
  - var. leiophylla (Meisn.) Meisn.
  - var. preissii Meisn.
- Aotus prosacris Chappill & C.F.Wilkins
- Aotus virgata Sieber ex DC.
- Aotus wuerthii Regel
