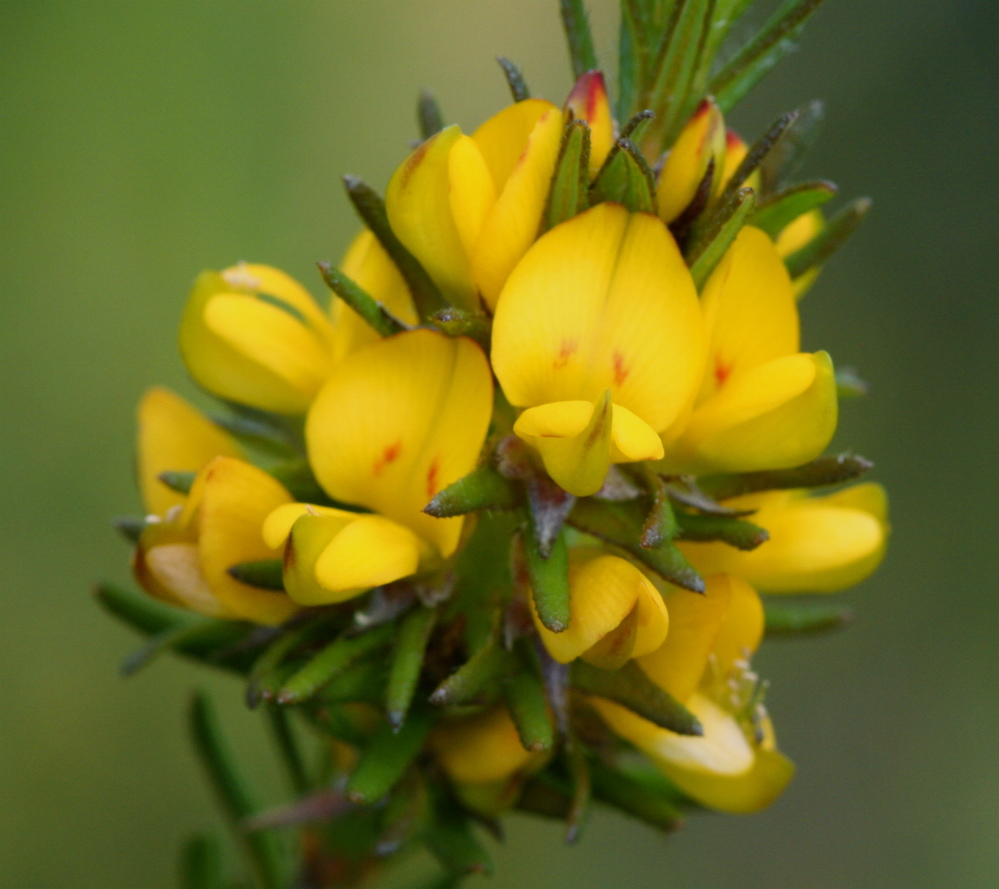
- Phyllota phylicoides

Scientific classification
- Kingdom: Plantae
- Clade: Tracheophytes
- Clade: Angiosperms
- Clade: Eudicots
- Clade: Rosids
- Order: Fabales
- Family: Fabaceae
- Subfamily: Faboideae
- Clade: Mirbelioids
- Genus: Phyllota; Benth. (1837)

Species
- 11; see text

Synonyms
- Walpersia Harv. (1861), nom. cons.

= Phyllota =

Genus of legumes

Phyllota is a genus of flowering plants in the legume family, Fabaceae. It includes 11 species of shrubs native to temperate southeastern and southwestern Australia, in the states of New South Wales, Queensland, South Australia, Victoria, and Western Australia. They inhabit open woodland and forest, mallee woodland, and heathland, from coastal to semi-arid and montane areas.

== Species ==
Phyllota comprises the following species:

- Phyllota barbata Benth.
- Phyllota diffusa (Hook.f.) F.Muell.
- Phyllota gracilis Turcz.
- Phyllota grandiflora Benth.
- Phyllota humifusa Benth.
- Phyllota humilis S.Moore
- Phyllota luehmannii F.Muell.
- Phyllota phylicoides (DC.) Benth.
- Phyllota pleurandroides F.Muell.
- Phyllota remota J.H.Willis
- Phyllota squarrosa (DC.) Benth.
