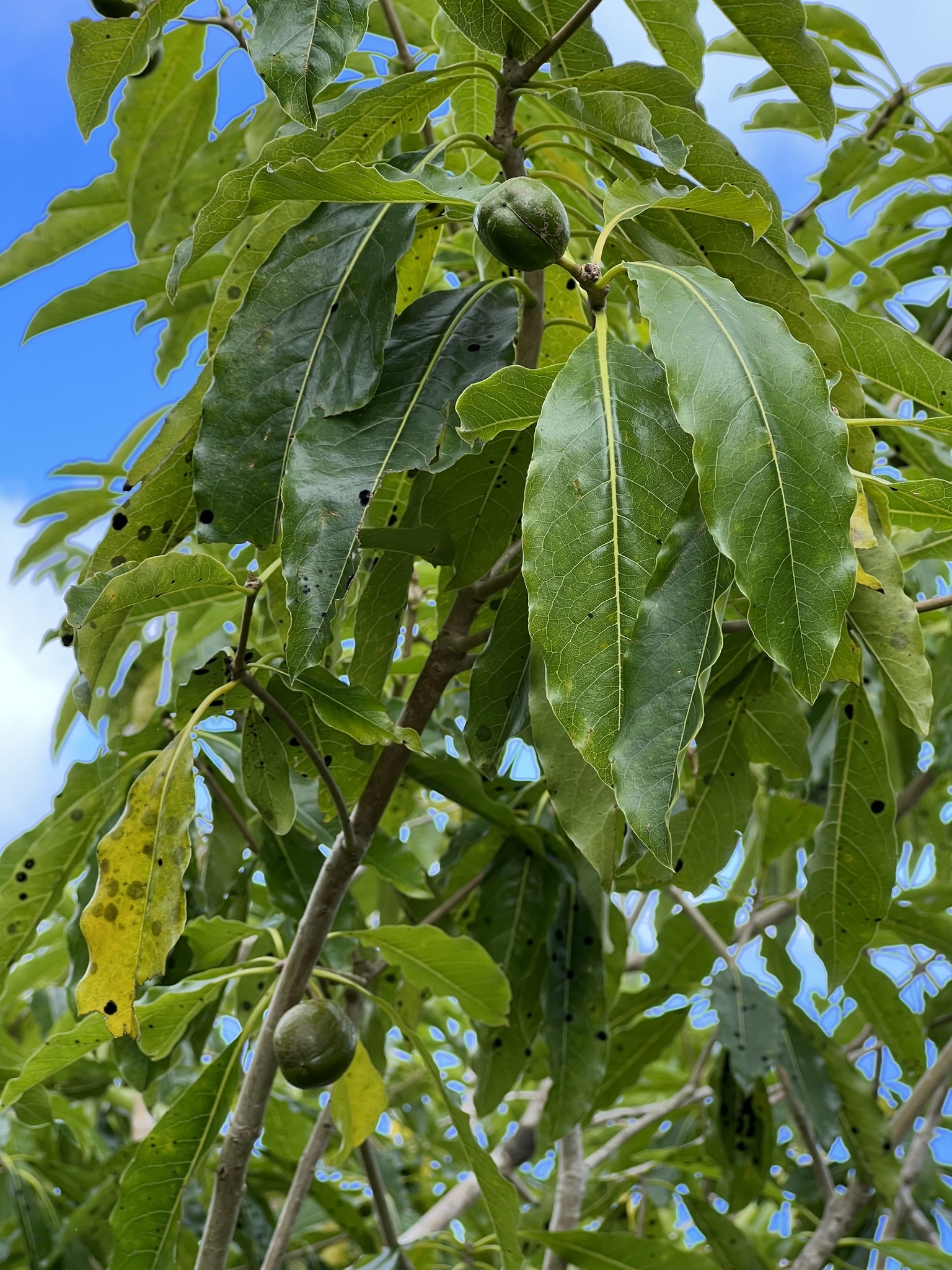
- Pittosporum rarotongense found in central Rarotonga

Conservation status
- Least Concern (IUCN 3.1)

Scientific classification
- Kingdom: Plantae
- Clade: Embryophytes
- Clade: Tracheophytes
- Clade: Angiosperms
- Clade: Eudicots
- Clade: Asterids
- Order: Apiales
- Family: Pittosporaceae
- Genus: Pittosporum
- Species: P. rarotongense

Binomial name
- Pittosporum rarotongense Hemsl. (1903)

= Pittosporum rarotongense =

Species of shrub

Pittosporum rarotongense (known as the Cook Islands pittosporum, kavakava or Mimi-ō-‘Ina) is a species of shrub or small tree in the family Pittosporaceae. It is endemic to the Cook Islands, growing on the islands of Rarotonga, Mangaia, Mauke and Mitiaro. On Rarotonga, it grows inland in the island's temperate cloud forest habitat.
