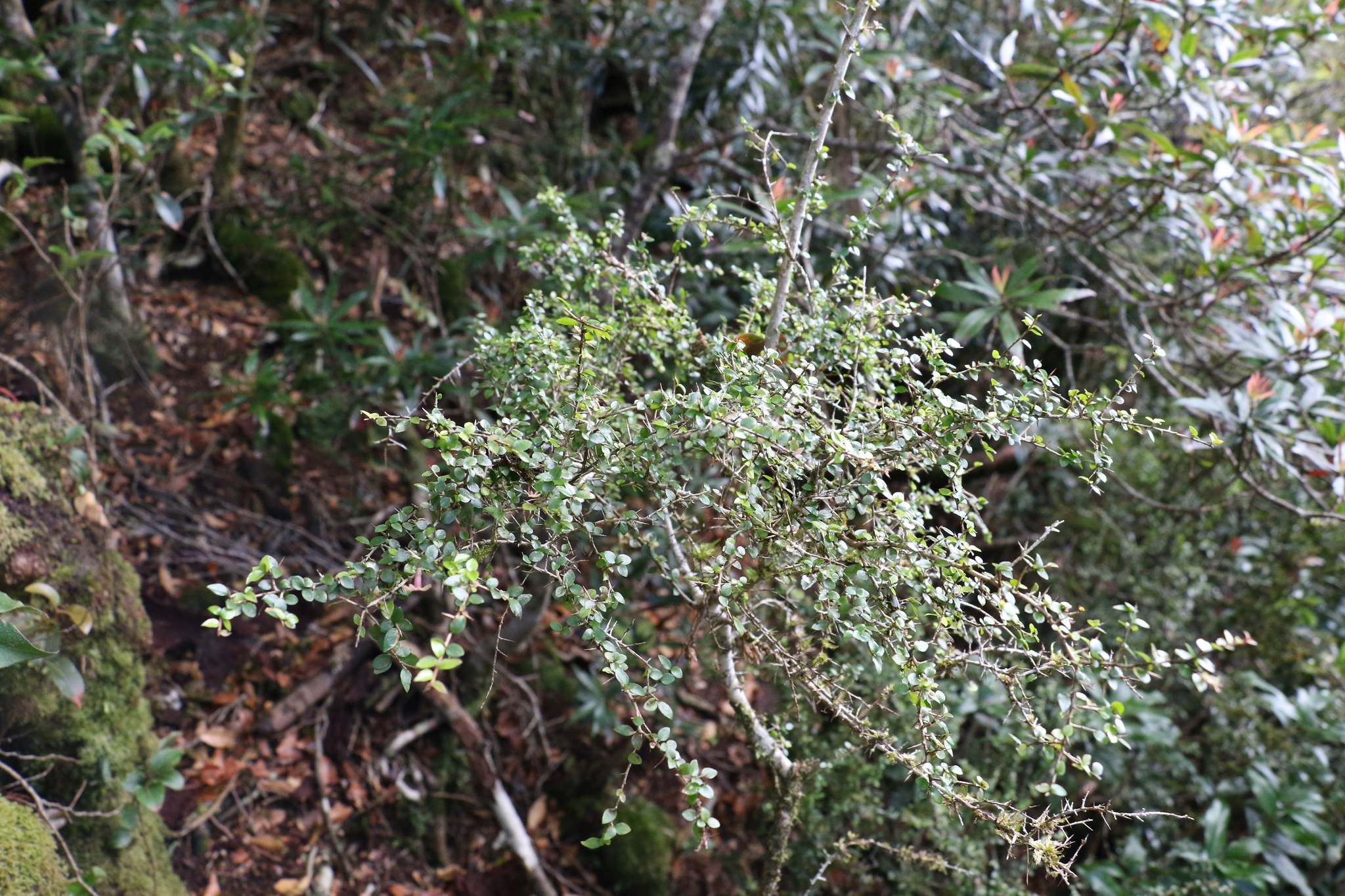

Scientific classification
- Kingdom: Plantae
- Clade: Tracheophytes
- Clade: Angiosperms
- Clade: Eudicots
- Clade: Asterids
- Order: Apiales
- Family: Pittosporaceae
- Genus: Pittosporum
- Species: P. oreillyanum

Binomial name
- Pittosporum oreillyanum C.T.White

= Pittosporum oreillyanum =

Thorny pittosporum

Species of flowering plant

Pittosporum oreillyanum is a species of plant in the Pittosporaceae family. Found in the border regions between the states of New South Wales and Queensland in Australia.

A shrub to small tree, up to 5 metres tall. This spiny plant may be seen growing in high altitude regions on the Mount Warning caldera. Often covered in hanging mosses and liverworts.

First collected by botanical science by Cyril Tenison White in 1929. The type location is "Mount Hobwee, Lamington National Park, near the New South Wales–Queensland border, altitude 4000 feet." This plant first appeared in scientific literature in 1936 in the "Contributions to the Queensland Flora, No. 5. Proceedings of the Royal Society of Queensland".
