= Pittosporum viridulum =

Conservation status
- Critically Endangered (IUCN 2.3)

Scientific classification
- Kingdom: Plantae
- Clade: Embryophytes
- Clade: Tracheophytes
- Clade: Angiosperms
- Clade: Eudicots
- Clade: Asterids
- Order: Apiales
- Family: Pittosporaceae
- Genus: Pittosporum
- Species: P. viridulum

Binomial name
- Pittosporum viridulum M.P.Nayar, G.S.Giri & V.Chandras.

Species of flowering plant

Pittosporum viridulum, formerly Pittosporum viridulatum, is a critically endangered species of plant in the family Pittosporaceae. It is endemic to the Nilgiris in Tamil Nadu, India.
