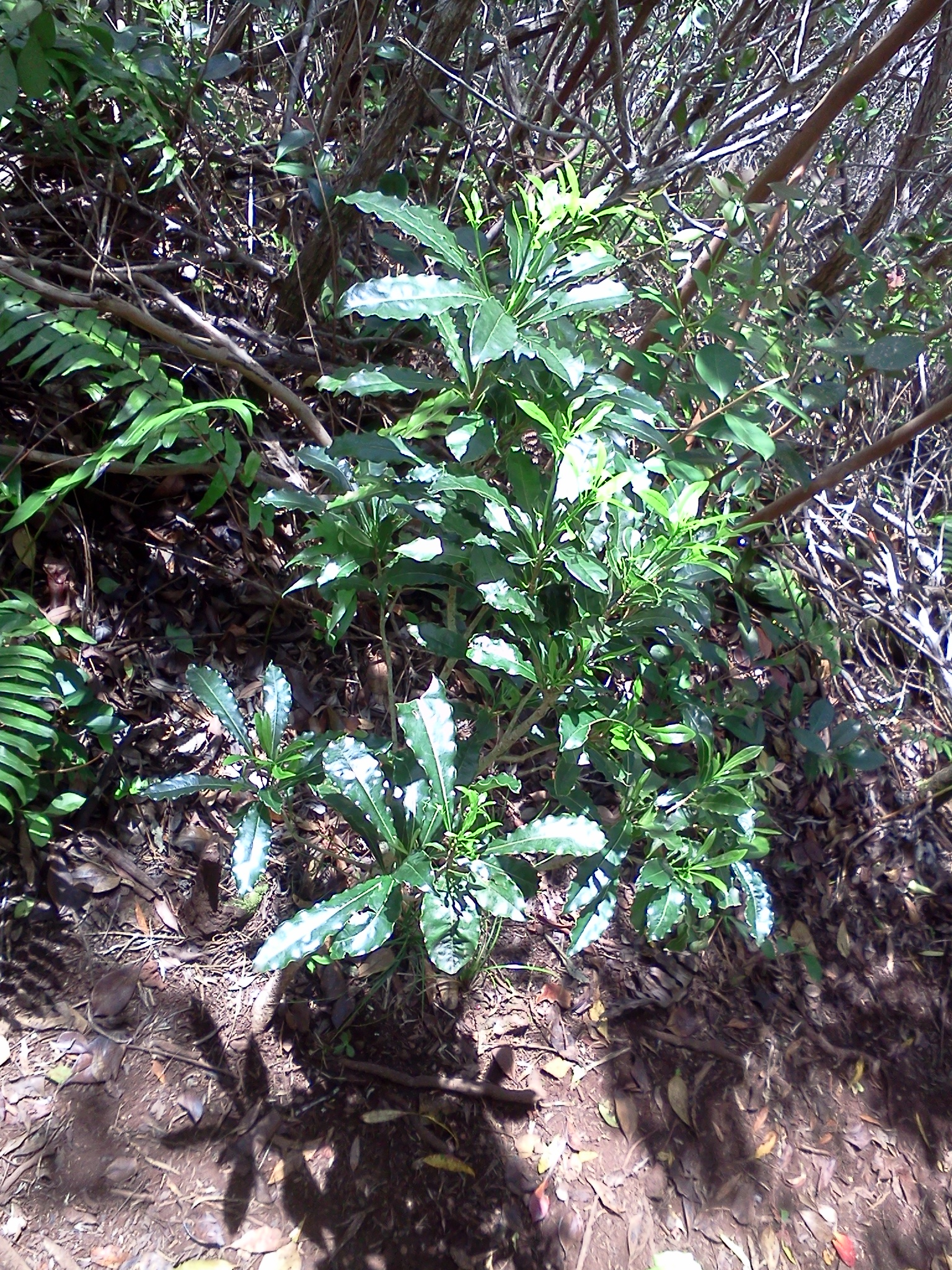

Scientific classification
- Kingdom: Plantae
- Clade: Tracheophytes
- Clade: Angiosperms
- Clade: Eudicots
- Clade: Asterids
- Order: Apiales
- Family: Pittosporaceae
- Genus: Pittosporum
- Species: P. senacia

Binomial name
- Pittosporum senacia Putt.

= Pittosporum senacia =

Species of shrub

Pittosporum senacia is a shrub that grows naturally on the Indian Ocean islands of Madagascar, Mauritius, Seychelles and La Réunion.
