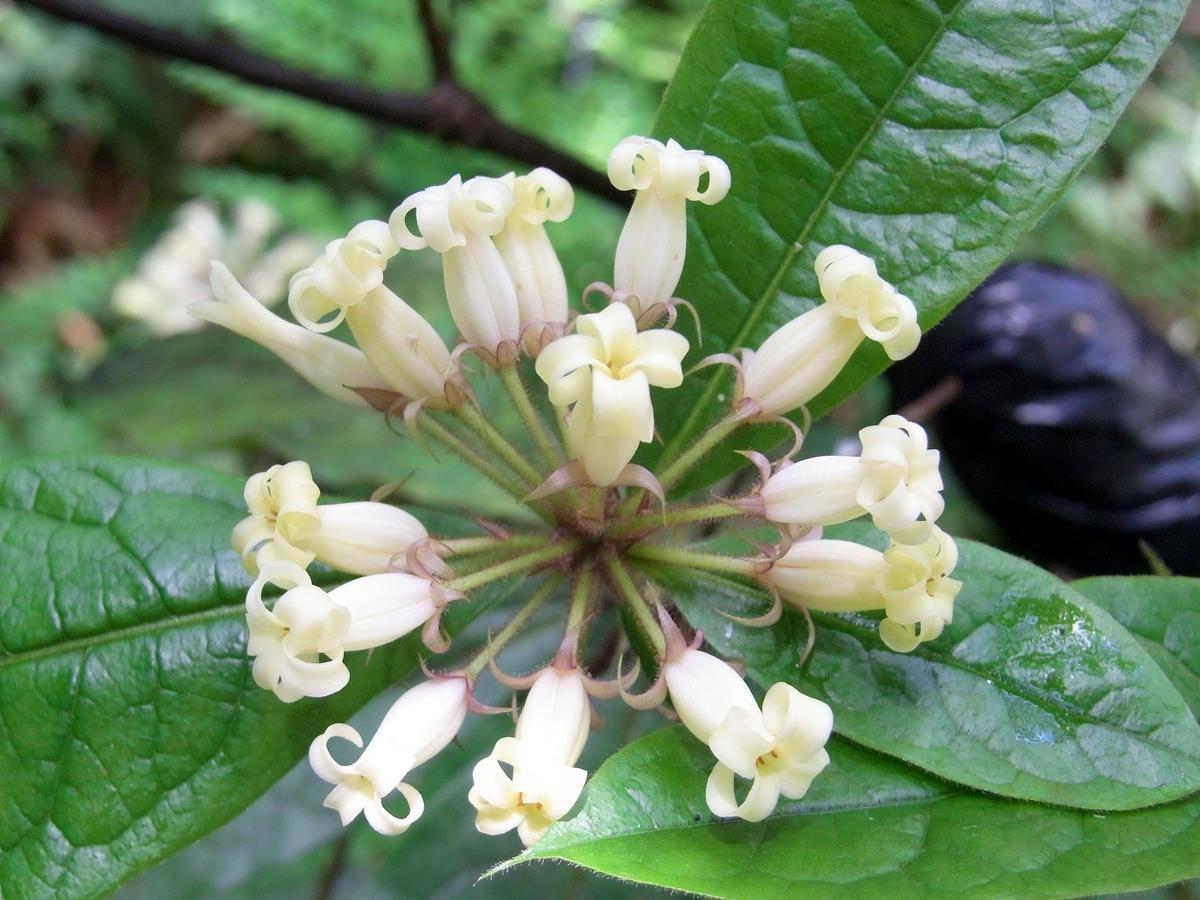
- Royal Botanic Gardens, Sydney

Conservation status
- Least Concern (NCA)

Scientific classification
- Kingdom: Plantae
- Clade: Tracheophytes
- Clade: Angiosperms
- Clade: Eudicots
- Clade: Asterids
- Order: Apiales
- Family: Pittosporaceae
- Genus: Pittosporum
- Species: P. wingii

Binomial name
- Pittosporum wingii F.Muell.

Synonyms
- Pittosporum rubiginosum subsp. wingii (F.Muell.) R.C.Cooper

= Pittosporum wingii =

Mountain pittosporum

Species of flowering plant

Pittosporum wingii, commonly known as the mountain pittosporum or hairy pittosporum, is a shrub or small tree native to tropical Queensland, Australia. It is an understorey plant reaching up to 8 m (26 ft) tall. It occurs in rainforest at a number of different sites, and at altitudes from 150 m (490 ft) to 1,100 m (3,600 ft) above sea level. It was first described in 1885.
