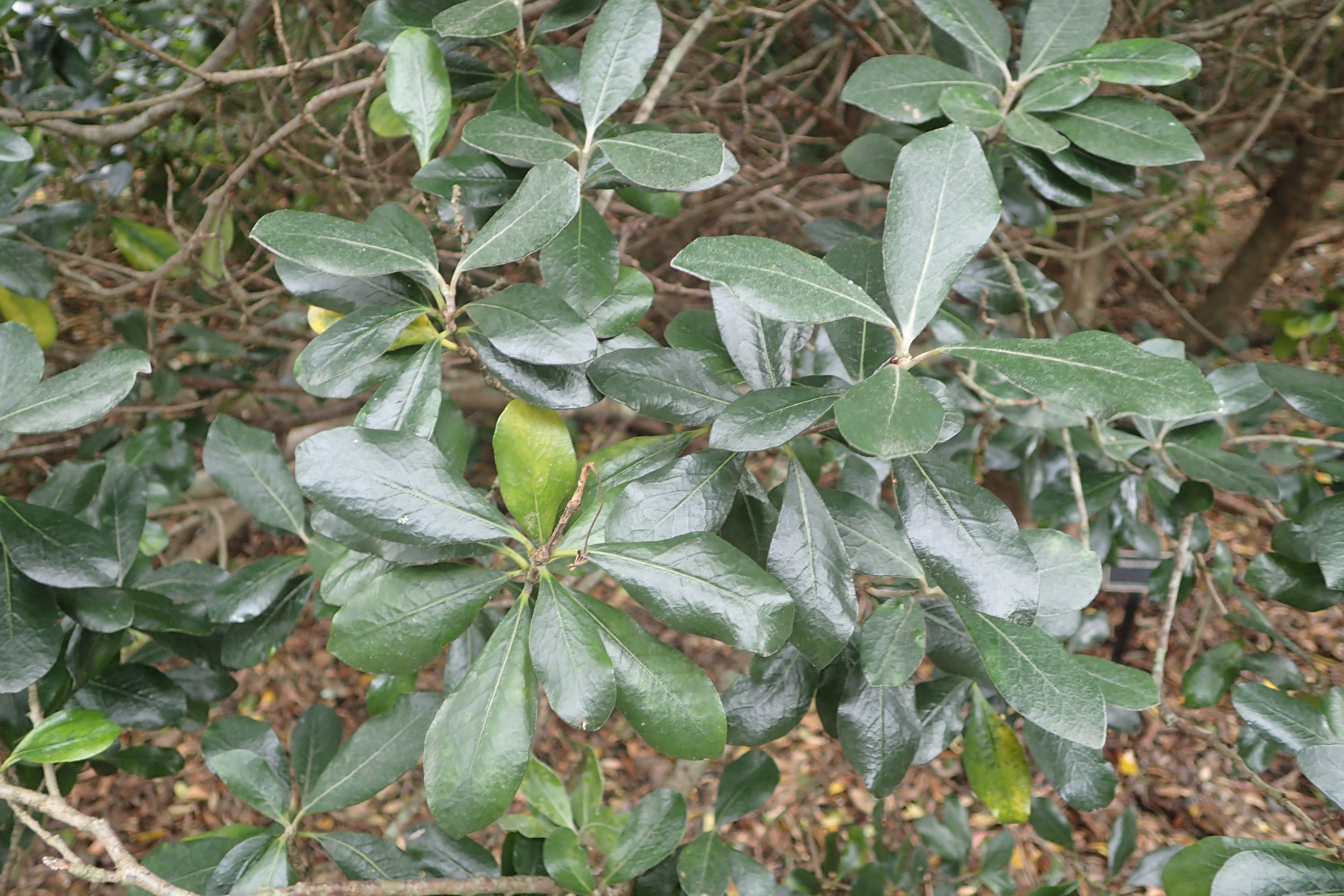

Conservation status
- Vulnerable (IUCN 2.3)

Scientific classification
- Kingdom: Plantae
- Clade: Tracheophytes
- Clade: Angiosperms
- Clade: Eudicots
- Clade: Asterids
- Order: Apiales
- Family: Pittosporaceae
- Genus: Pittosporum
- Species: P. fairchildii

Binomial name
- Pittosporum fairchildii Cheeseman, 1888

= Pittosporum fairchildii =

Species of flowering plant

Pittosporum fairchildii, commonly called Fairchild's kohuhu, is a species of plant in the Pittosporaceae family. It is endemic to New Zealand. This species was first described by Thomas Frederic Cheeseman. It is named in honour of Captain J. Fairchild, a 19th-century seaman who commanded the S.S. Stella.

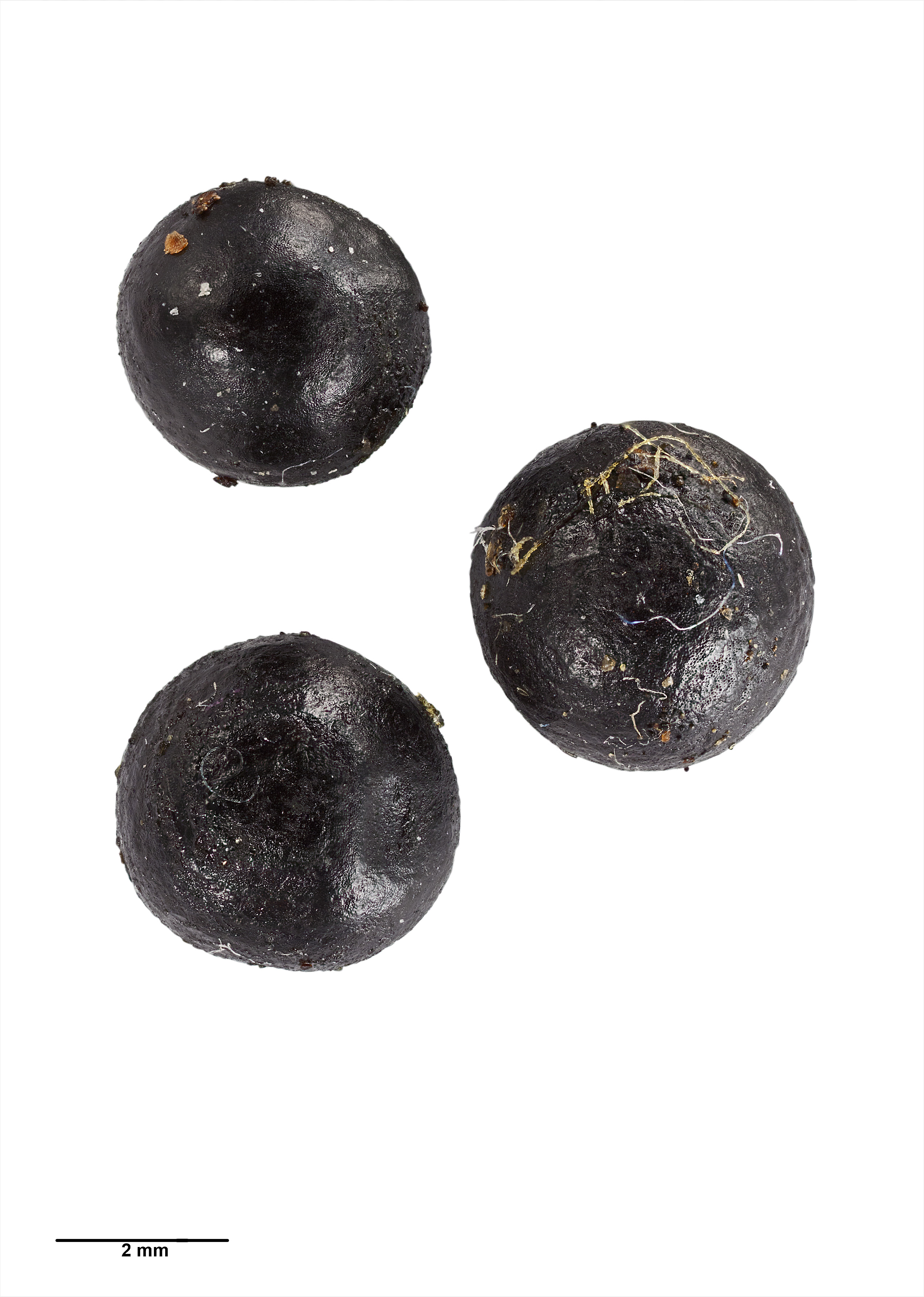
Pittosporum fairchildii seeds
