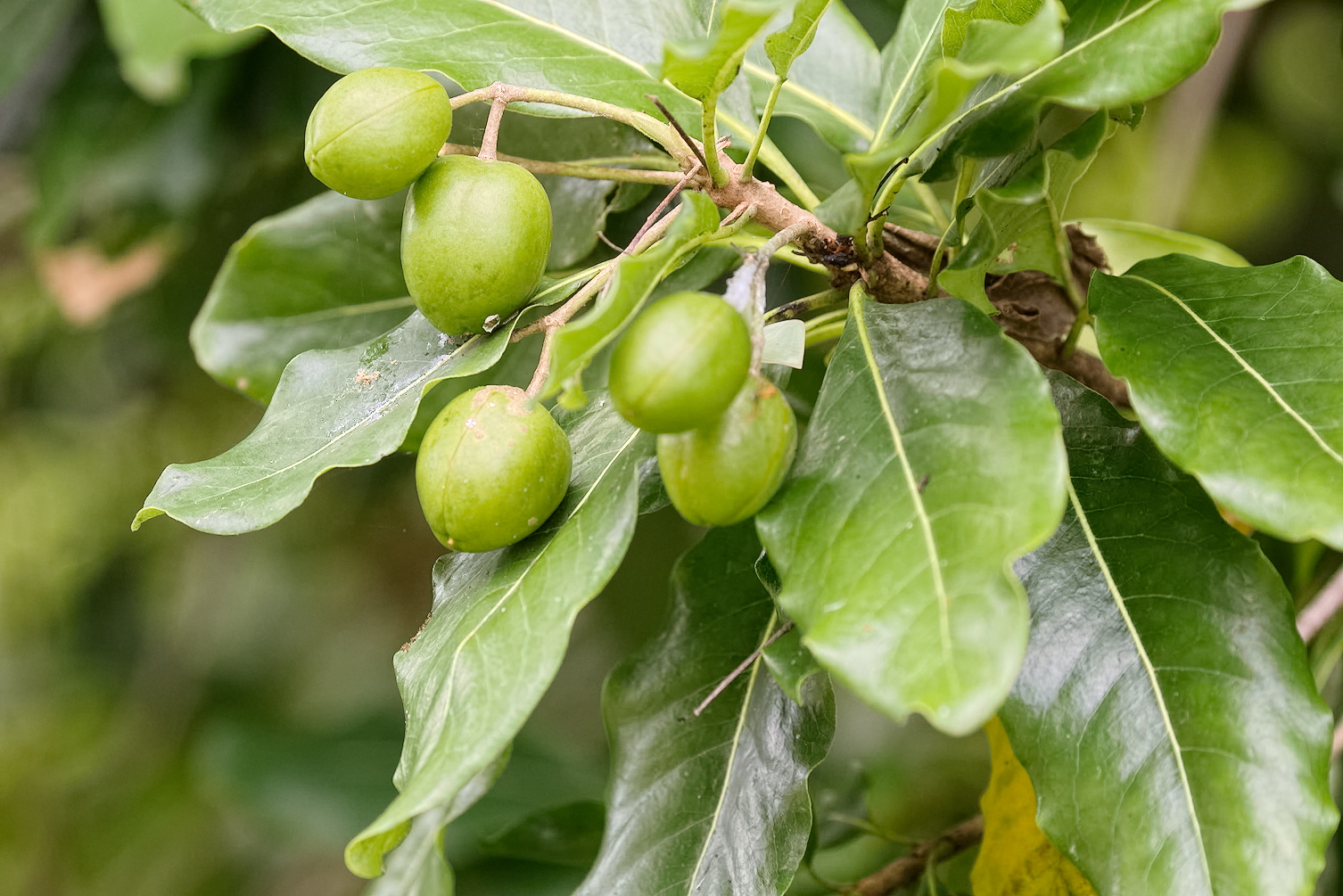
- At East Point, Darwin

Conservation status
- Least Concern (IUCN 3.1)

Scientific classification
- Kingdom: Plantae
- Clade: Tracheophytes
- Clade: Angiosperms
- Clade: Eudicots
- Clade: Asterids
- Order: Apiales
- Family: Pittosporaceae
- Genus: Pittosporum
- Species: P. moluccanum

Binomial name
- Pittosporum moluccanum (Lam.) Miq.

Synonyms
- Anasser moluccana Lam.; Pittosporum ferrugineum var. moluccanum (Lam.) Boerl.; Anasser rumphii Span.; Pittosporum rumphii Putt.; Pittosporum zollingerianum Binn. ex Koord. & Valeton; Pittosporum zollingerianum var. tenuinervis Boerl.

= Pittosporum moluccanum =

Species of shrub

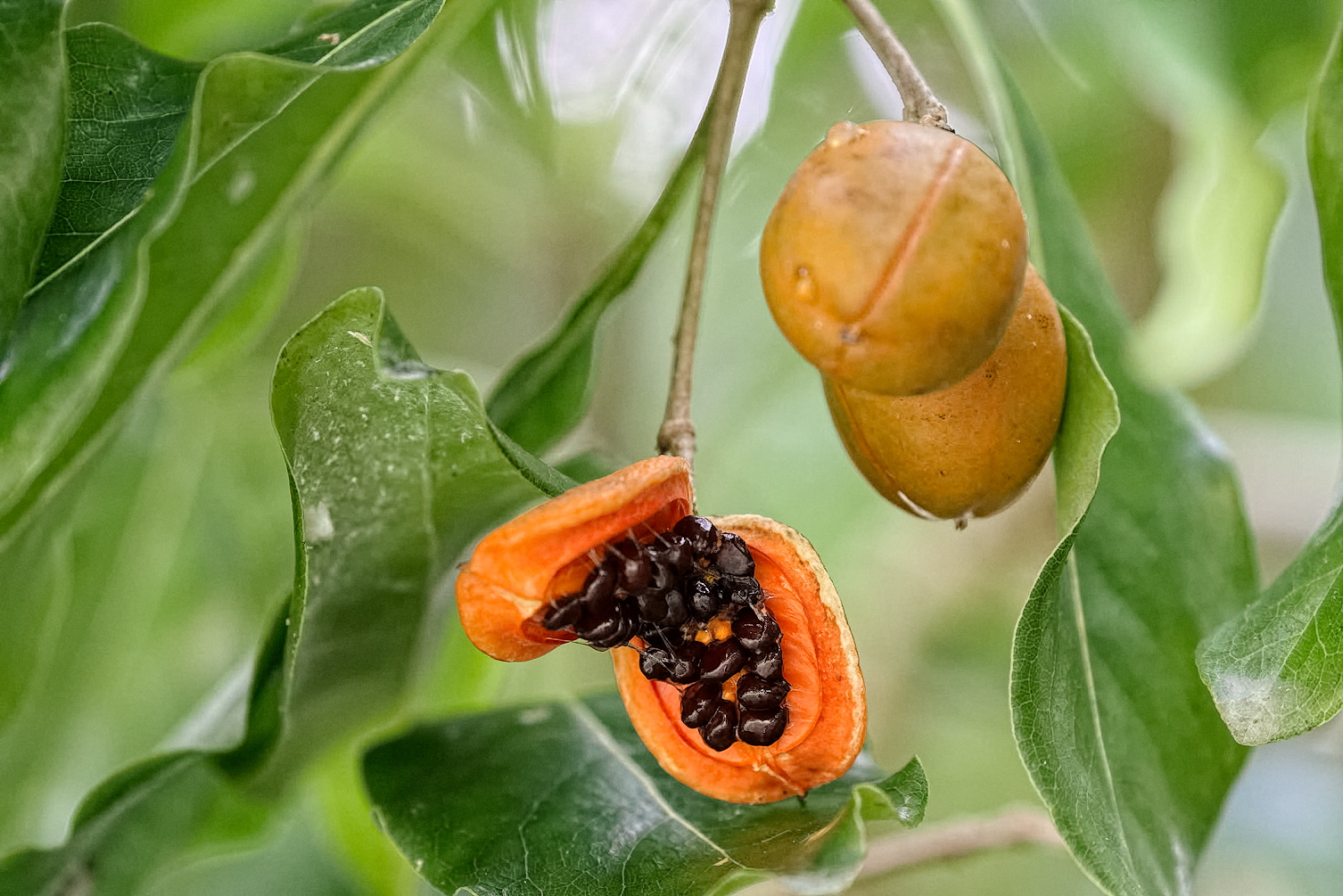
At East Point in Darwin.

Pittosporum moluccanum, commonly known as the Atlas moth plant, is a small tree growing in the Northern Territory and Western Australia in Australia, as well as Taiwan, the Philippines and Malesia.

== Description ==
Pittosporum moluccanum is a small, rounded, dioecious tree that grows to around 7 metres. It flowers in from February to August in dry in monsoonal northern Australia. Fruits are 10 mm (0.39 in) long by 8 mm (0.31 in) wide capsules that ripen orange-brown, inner bright yellow; they contain 15–16 seeds enclosed in bright red sticky arils.

It is a host plant for the Atlas Moth.

== Taxonomy ==
Pittosporum moluccanum was circumscribed by Bakker in 1957. It is described as a complex of species that extend from Taiwan, Philippines, Celebes, Moluccas, Malaysia, Eastern Java, Java and the lesser Sunda Island. The Australian species found in the Northern Territory and Western Australia appears to be the common with the eastern Indonesian coastal species Pittosporum timorense.
