= Pittosporum tanianum =

Conservation status
- Critically Endangered (IUCN 3.1)

Scientific classification
- Kingdom: Plantae
- Clade: Tracheophytes
- Clade: Angiosperms
- Clade: Eudicots
- Clade: Asterids
- Order: Apiales
- Family: Pittosporaceae
- Genus: Pittosporum
- Species: P. tanianum

Binomial name
- Pittosporum tanianum Veillon & Tirel

Species of flowering plant

Pittosporum tanianum is a species of plant in the Pittosporaceae family. It is endemic to New Caledonia. Its natural habitat is temperate forests. It is threatened by habitat loss.
