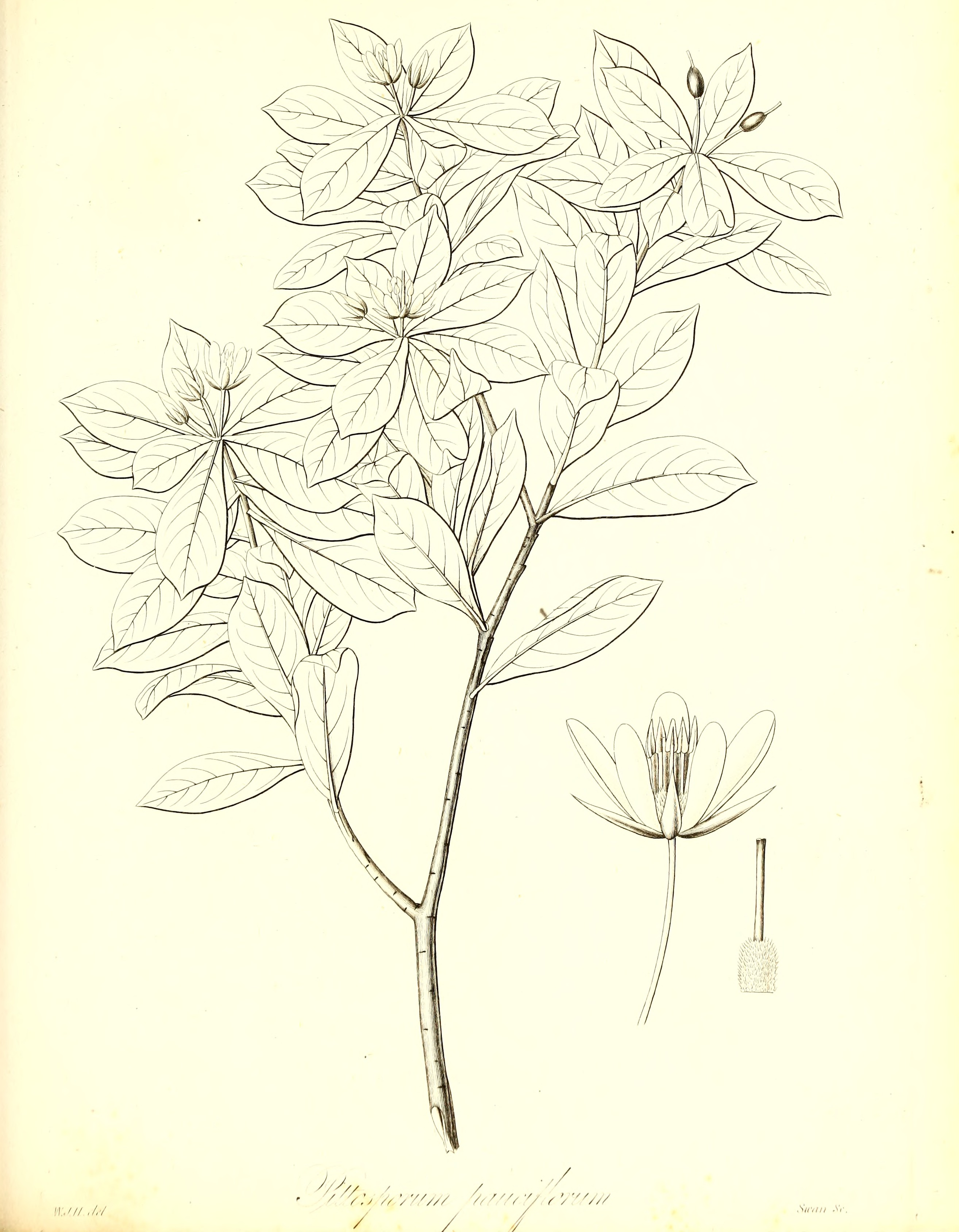

Conservation status
- Vulnerable (IUCN 2.3)

Scientific classification
- Kingdom: Plantae
- Clade: Tracheophytes
- Clade: Angiosperms
- Clade: Eudicots
- Clade: Asterids
- Order: Apiales
- Family: Pittosporaceae
- Genus: Pittosporum
- Species: P. pauciflorum

Binomial name
- Pittosporum pauciflorum Hook.

= Pittosporum pauciflorum =

Species of flowering plant

Pittosporum pauciflorum is a species of plant in the family Pittosporaceae. It is endemic to China.
