= Pittosporum koghiense =

Conservation status
- Near Threatened (IUCN 3.1)

Scientific classification
- Kingdom: Plantae
- Clade: Embryophytes
- Clade: Tracheophytes
- Clade: Angiosperms
- Clade: Eudicots
- Clade: Asterids
- Order: Apiales
- Family: Pittosporaceae
- Genus: Pittosporum
- Species: P. koghiense

Binomial name
- Pittosporum koghiense Guillaumin

Synonyms
- Pittosporum stenophyllum Guillaumin

Species of flowering plant

Pittosporum koghiense, synonym Pittosporum stenophyllum, is a species of plant in the Pittosporaceae family. It is endemic to New Caledonia.
