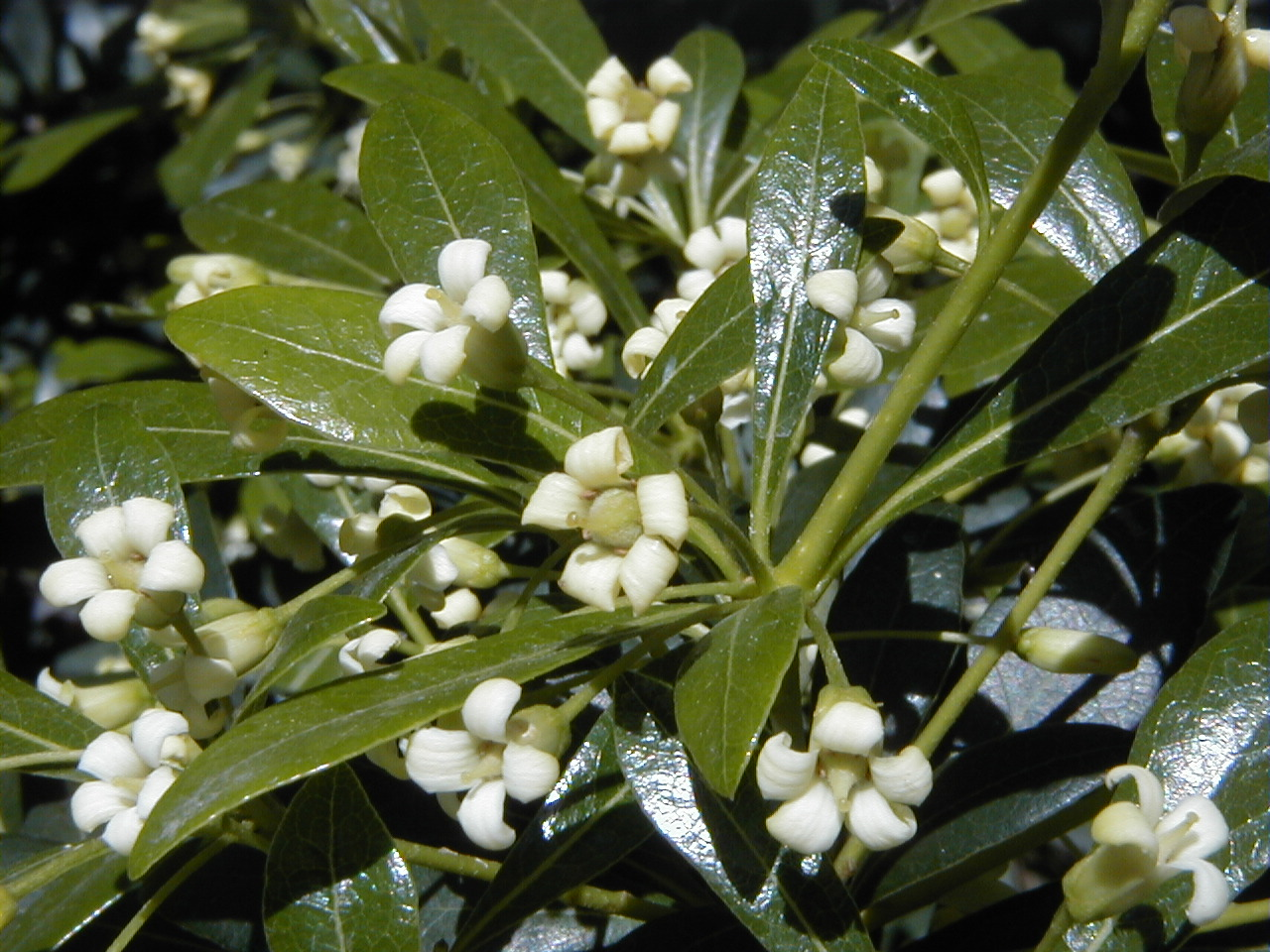
- Flowers and foliage

Scientific classification
- Kingdom: Plantae
- Clade: Tracheophytes
- Clade: Angiosperms
- Clade: Eudicots
- Clade: Asterids
- Order: Apiales
- Family: Pittosporaceae
- Genus: Pittosporum
- Species: P. heterophyllum

Binomial name
- Pittosporum heterophyllum Franch

= Pittosporum heterophyllum =

Species of plant

Pittosporum heterophyllum, commonly known as Chinese Pittosporum, is a species of plant in the genus Pittosporum. Native to China and Tibet, it is a broadleaf evergreen shrub that grows to a maximum of 8–10 feet (2.4–3.0 m) tall. It has long been grown in gardens ornamentally, especially as a hedge or screen, in temperate gardens for its densely packed green foliage and the fragrant white to yellow flowers it produces in spring. As a landscaping plant, it is known for being more cold hardy than Pittosporum tobira and can be grown in hardiness zones 7-9 on the USDA scale.
