= Pittosporum ceylanicum =

Scientific classification
- Kingdom: Plantae
- Clade: Tracheophytes
- Clade: Angiosperms
- Clade: Eudicots
- Clade: Asterids
- Order: Apiales
- Family: Pittosporaceae
- Genus: Pittosporum
- Species: P. ceylanicum

Binomial name
- Pittosporum ceylanicum Wight.

Species of flowering plant

Pittosporum ceylanicum is a species of plant in the Pittosporaceae family. It is endemic to Sri Lanka.

== Culture ==
Known as "කෙටිය - ketiya" in Sinhala.
