= Pittosporum coccineum =

Conservation status
- Data Deficient (IUCN 3.1)

Scientific classification
- Kingdom: Plantae
- Clade: Embryophytes
- Clade: Tracheophytes
- Clade: Angiosperms
- Clade: Eudicots
- Clade: Asterids
- Order: Apiales
- Family: Pittosporaceae
- Genus: Pittosporum
- Species: P. coccineum

Binomial name
- Pittosporum coccineum (Montrouz.) Beauvis.

Synonyms
- Quinsonia coccinea Montrouz.; Pittosporum capitatum Brongn. & Gris; Pittosporum gomonenense Guillaumin; Pittosporum vieillardii Brongn. & Gris

Species of flowering plant

Pittosporum coccineum, synonym Pittosporum gomonenense, is a species of plant in the Pittosporaceae family. It is endemic to New Caledonia.
