= Pittosporum orohenense =

Conservation status
- Vulnerable (IUCN 3.1)

Scientific classification
- Kingdom: Plantae
- Clade: Embryophytes
- Clade: Tracheophytes
- Clade: Angiosperms
- Clade: Eudicots
- Clade: Asterids
- Order: Apiales
- Family: Pittosporaceae
- Genus: Pittosporum
- Species: P. orohenense

Binomial name
- Pittosporum orohenense J.W.Moore (1940)

Species of flowering plant

Pittosporum orohenense is a species of flowering plant in the Pittosporaceae family. It is a tree endemic to the island of Tahiti in the Society Islands of French Polynesia. It grows in montane tropical moist forest.
