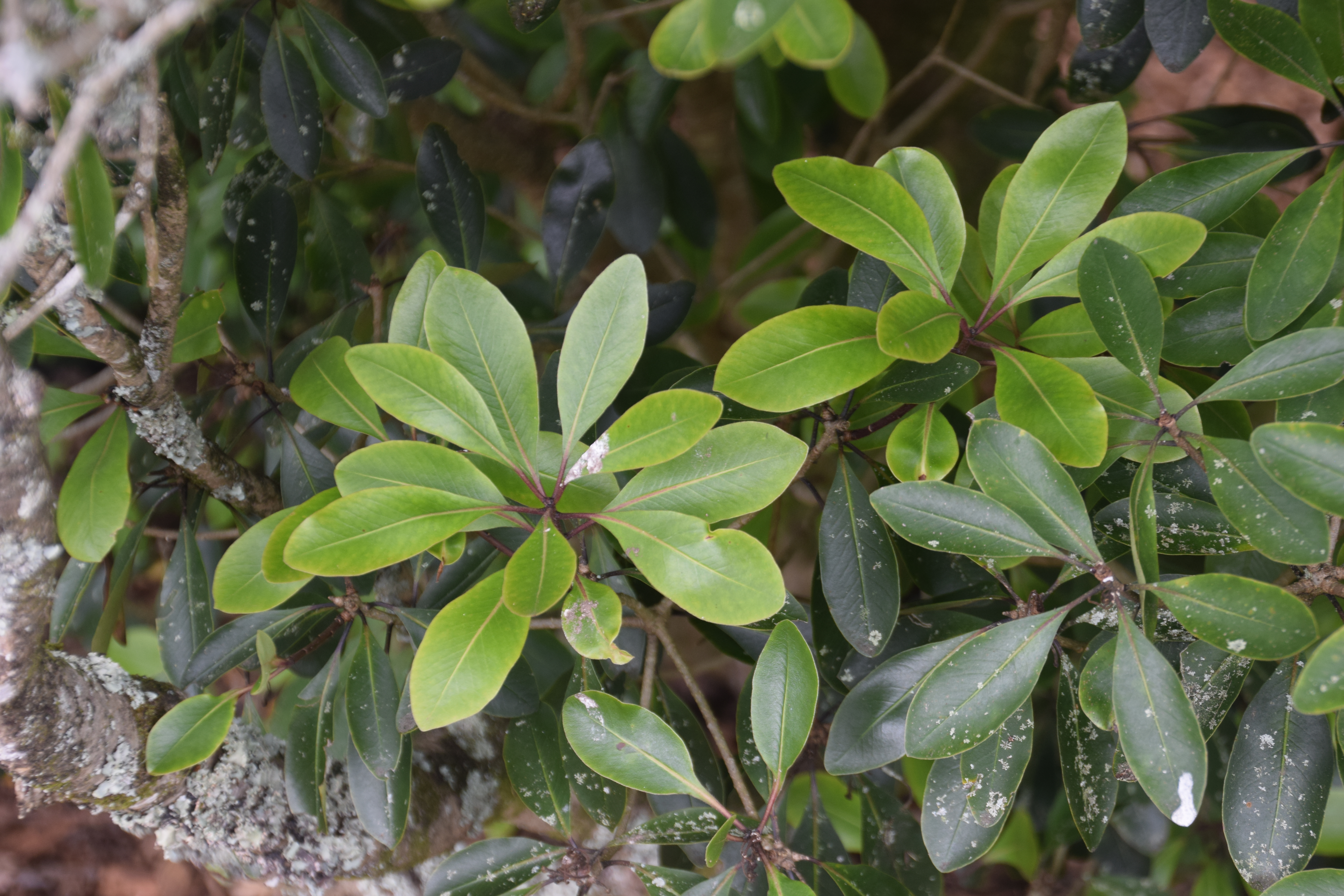

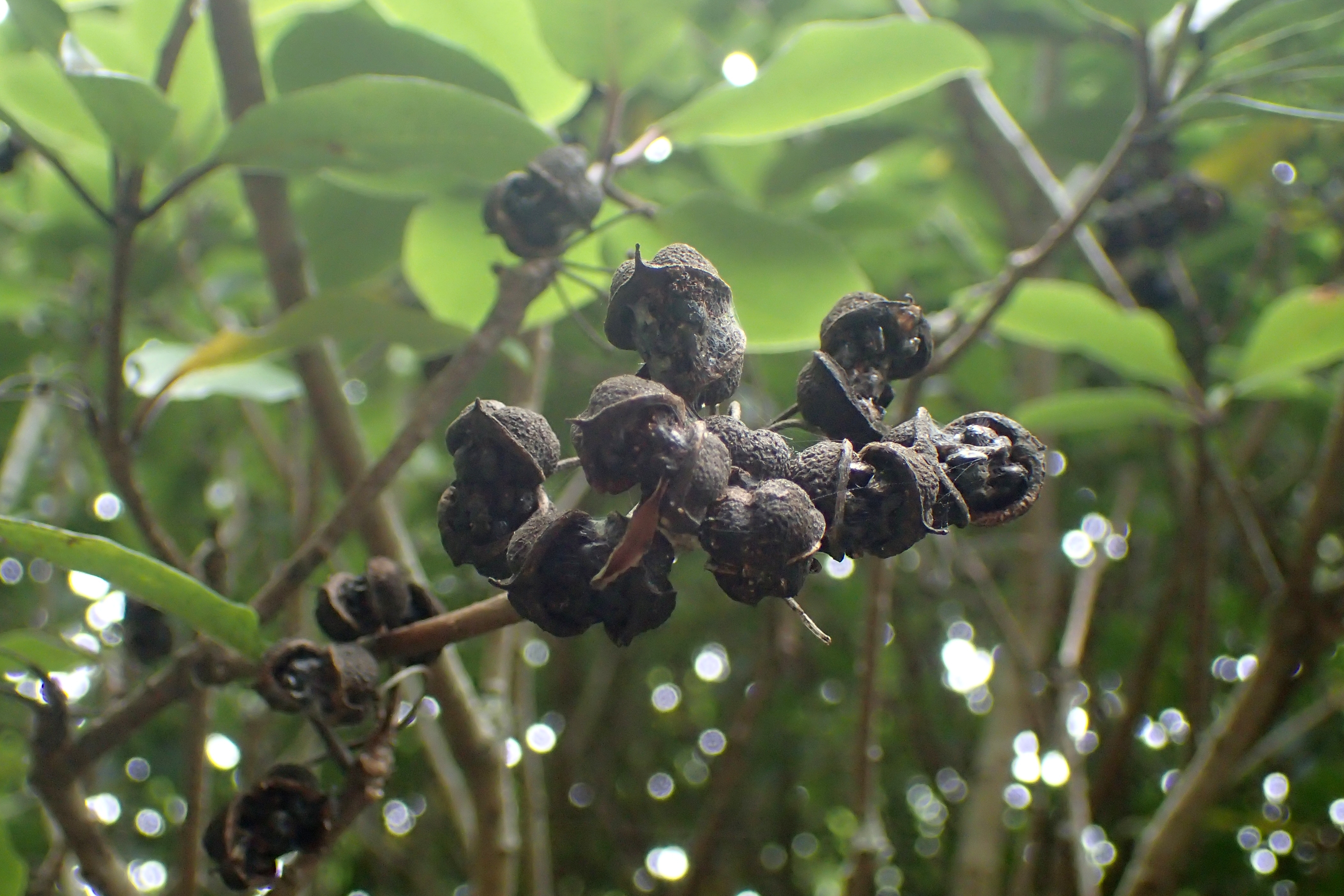

Scientific classification
- Kingdom: Plantae
- Clade: Tracheophytes
- Clade: Angiosperms
- Clade: Eudicots
- Clade: Asterids
- Order: Apiales
- Family: Pittosporaceae
- Genus: Pittosporum
- Species: P. umbellatum

Binomial name
- Pittosporum umbellatum Banks et Sol. ex Gaertn. (1788).

Synonyms
- Pittosporum umbellatum var. umbellatum Banks et Sol. ex Gaertn.; Pittosporum umbellatum var. cordatum Kirk

= Pittosporum umbellatum =

Species of evergreen tree

Pittosporum umbellatum (Māori: haekaro) is a small evergreen tree endemic to New Zealand.

== Description ==
Pittosporum umbellatum is endemic to the coastal forests in the North Island from North Cape to Gisborne. It is small tree (average 7 m (23 ft) tall, up to 12 m (39 ft)) bearing flat smooth glossy green oval leaves and clusters of small pinkish or red flowers with a pale body on long stalks and 1.5 cm-wide (0.59 in) capsules that split into two to show the black sticky seeds. Its leaves are 5–10 cm (2.0–3.9 in) long, and are ridged along the upper surface
