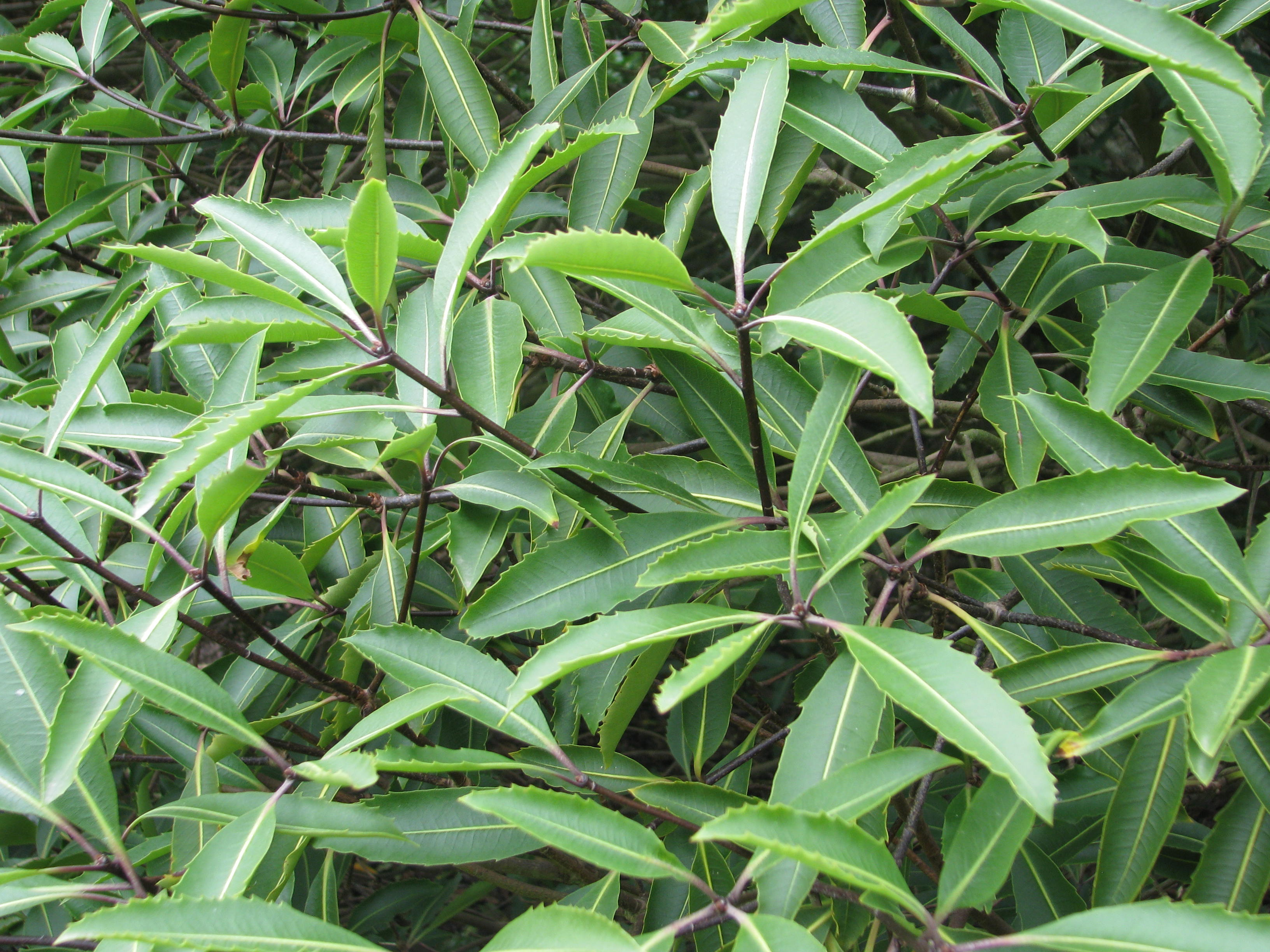

Conservation status
- Vulnerable (IUCN 2.3)

Scientific classification
- Kingdom: Plantae
- Clade: Tracheophytes
- Clade: Angiosperms
- Clade: Eudicots
- Clade: Asterids
- Order: Apiales
- Family: Pittosporaceae
- Genus: Pittosporum
- Species: P. dallii

Binomial name
- Pittosporum dallii Cheeseman, 1906

= Pittosporum dallii =

Species of flowering plant

Pittosporum dallii is a species of plant in the Pittosporaceae family. It is endemic to New Zealand.
