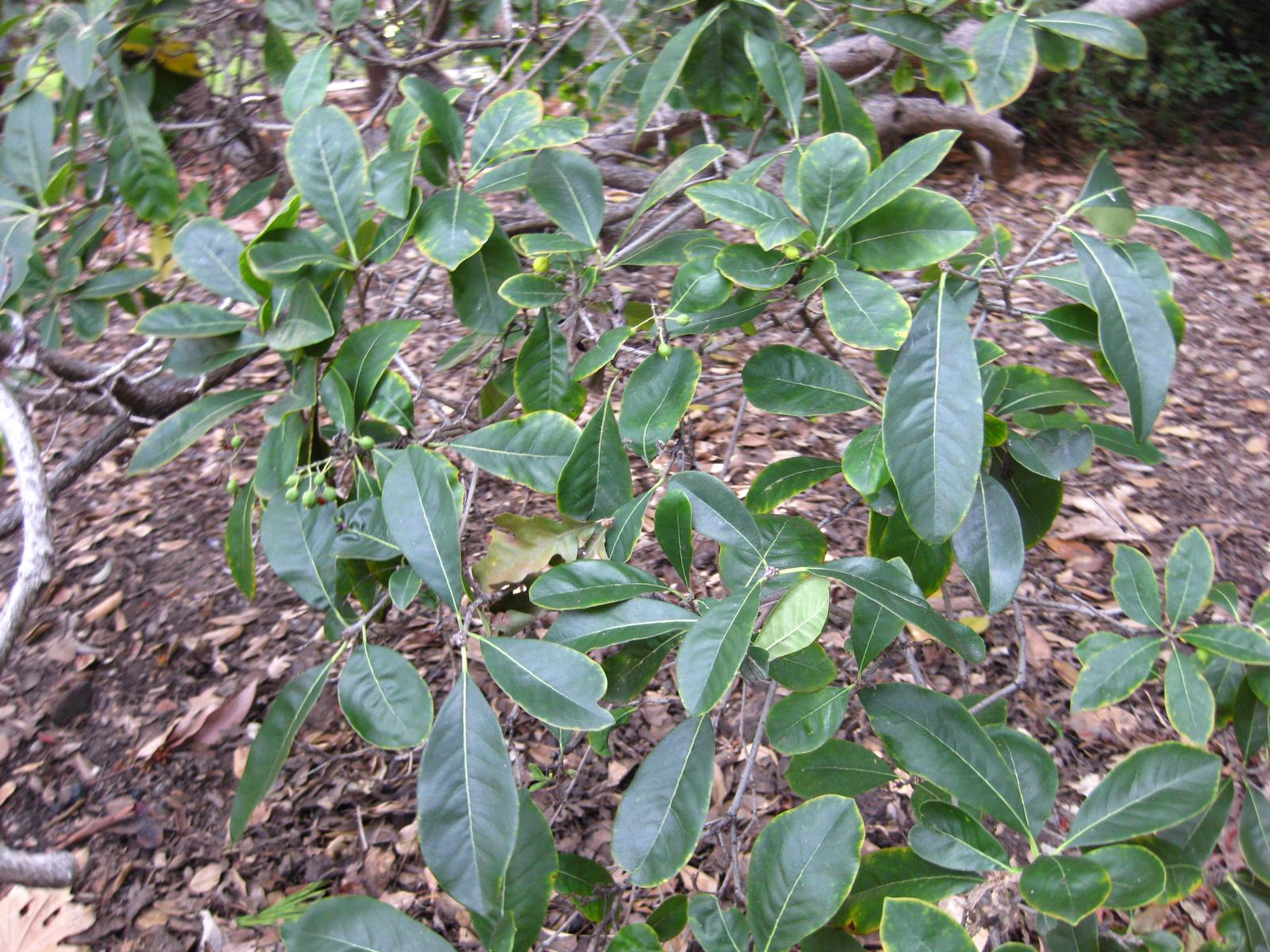

Conservation status
- Endangered (IUCN 2.3)

Scientific classification
- Kingdom: Plantae
- Clade: Embryophytes
- Clade: Tracheophytes
- Clade: Angiosperms
- Clade: Eudicots
- Clade: Asterids
- Order: Apiales
- Family: Pittosporaceae
- Genus: Pittosporum
- Species: P. eriocarpum

Binomial name
- Pittosporum eriocarpum Royle

= Pittosporum eriocarpum =

Species of flowering plant

Pittosporum eriocarpum is a plant species of the Indian subcontinent in the Pittosporaceae family, native to Himachal Pradesh and Uttar Pradesh. This taxon is threatened by habitat loss.
