= Pittosporum linearifolium =

Conservation status
- Vulnerable (IUCN 3.1)

Scientific classification
- Kingdom: Plantae
- Clade: Tracheophytes
- Clade: Angiosperms
- Clade: Eudicots
- Clade: Asterids
- Order: Apiales
- Family: Pittosporaceae
- Genus: Pittosporum
- Species: P. linearifolium

Binomial name
- Pittosporum linearifolium J.B. Sugau

Species of tree

Pittosporum linearifolium is a species of plant in the family Pittosporaceae. It is a tree which grows up to 8 metres tall. It is endemic to Borneo where it is confined to Sabah.

Pittosporum linearifolium is known only from Bukit Hampuan in Ranau District. It grows in lower montane forest on ultramafic soil, from 1,200 to 1,400 metres elevation.
