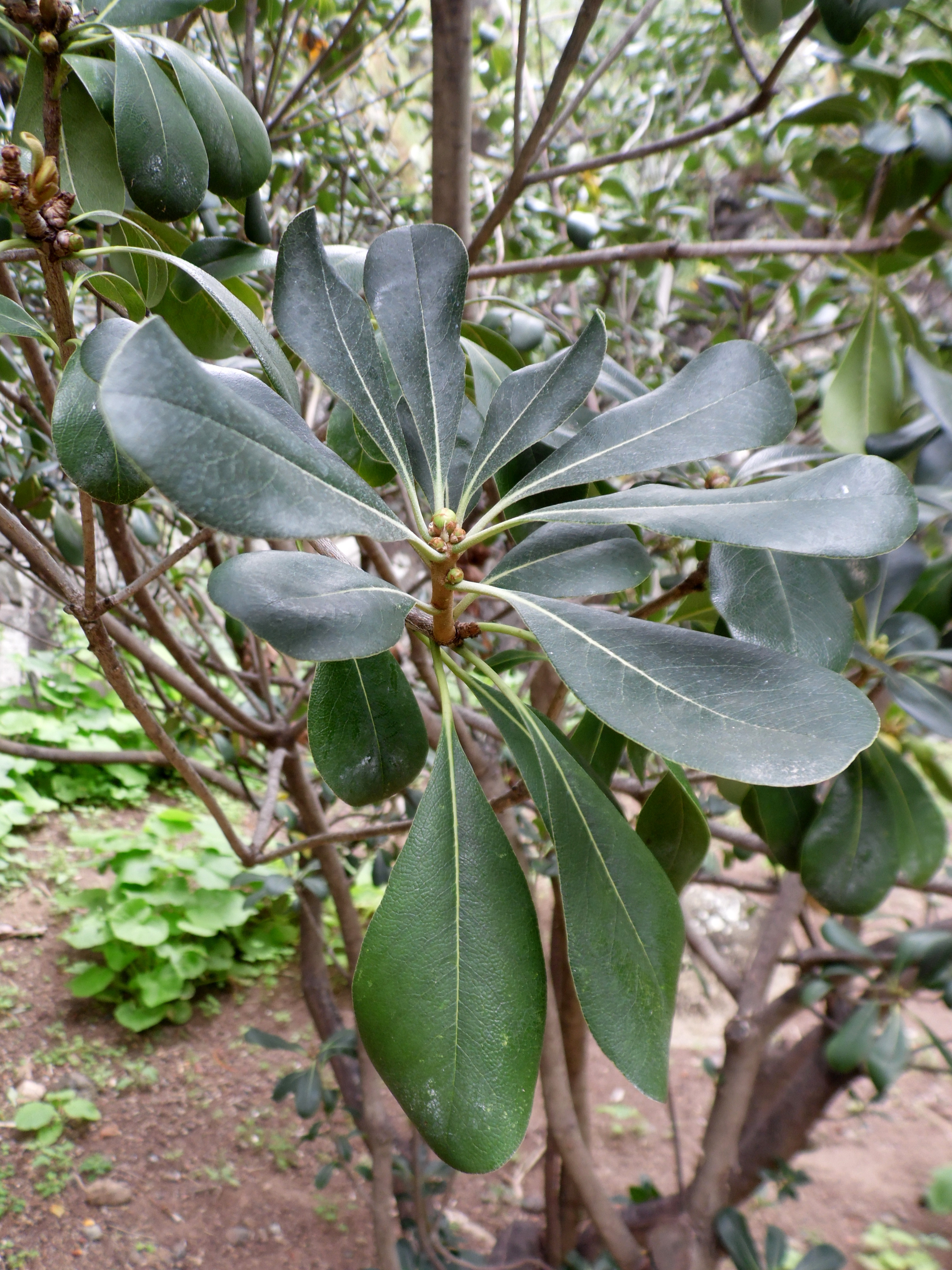

Conservation status
- Critically Endangered (IUCN 3.1)

Scientific classification
- Kingdom: Plantae
- Clade: Tracheophytes
- Clade: Angiosperms
- Clade: Eudicots
- Clade: Asterids
- Order: Apiales
- Family: Pittosporaceae
- Genus: Pittosporum
- Species: P. coriaceum

Binomial name
- Pittosporum coriaceum Dryand. ex Aiton

= Pittosporum coriaceum =

Species of flowering plant

Pittosporum coriaceum is a species of plant in the Pittosporaceae family. It is endemic to Macaronesia, and due to extinction in the Canary Islands, it is now restricted to the Portuguese Madeira Islands.

Pittosporum coriaceum is a Critically endangered species due to habitat loss.
