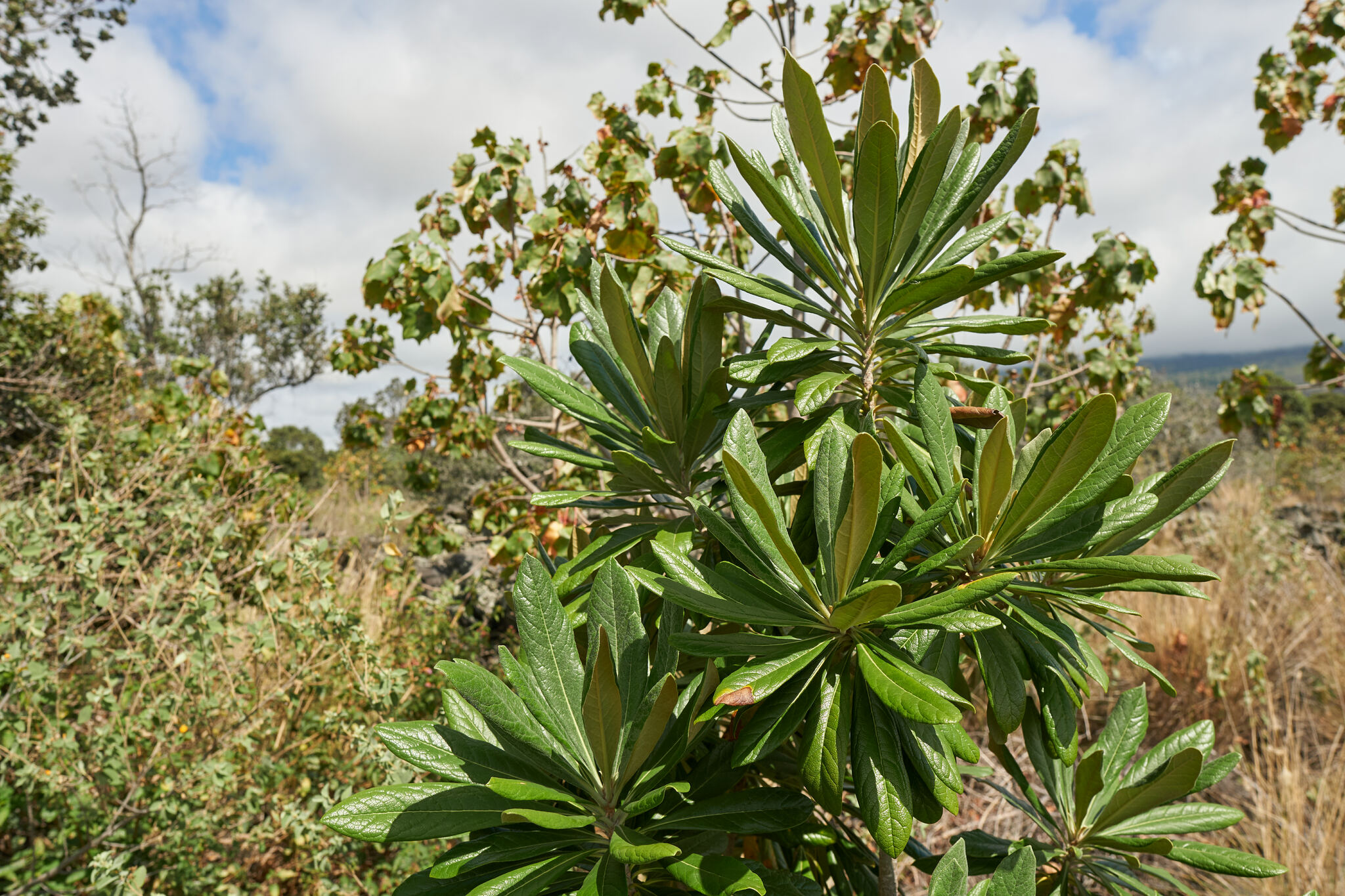
- Growing in dry forest on the lower slopes of Hualālai

Conservation status
- Vulnerable (IUCN 3.1)

- Imperiled (NatureServe)

Scientific classification
- Kingdom: Plantae
- Clade: Tracheophytes
- Clade: Angiosperms
- Clade: Eudicots
- Clade: Asterids
- Order: Apiales
- Family: Pittosporaceae
- Genus: Pittosporum
- Species: P. hosmeri

Binomial name
- Pittosporum hosmeri Rock

= Pittosporum hosmeri =

Species of tree

Pittosporum hosmeri, also referred to as Kona cheesewood, ʻaʻawa, or ʻaʻawa hua kukui, is a cheesewood endemic to the island of Hawai'i. It is a species of tree in the Pittosporaceae family. This species is listed as endangered and are endemic to the islands. Like other members of the genus native to Hawai'i, it is also referred to as Hō'awa or Hāʻawa in the Hawaiian language.

== Description ==
Pittosporum hosmeri is a small tree with height ranging from 10 to 25 feet (3.0 to 7.6 m). Branches are typically smooth, but new growth is often covered in woolly brown hairs. Leaves are leathery and oblong, ranging in length of 3 to 10 inches (7.6 to 25.4 cm). Large white flower clusters can bloom throughout the year.

The fruits of the Pittosporum hosmeri are 1–3 inches (2.5–7.6 cm) fuzzy brown capsules. They contain ~40 seeds arranged in two rows.

== Distribution and habitat ==
Pittosporum hosmeri is endemic to Hawai'i. It can be found in wet and mesic forests on the west and south sides of the island of Hawai'i at an elevation of 1,200 to 3,500 ft (370 to 1,070 m). It can also occasionally be found in dry leeward forests.

== Human use ==
The plant has traditionally had use as wood for gunwales in canoes. The outer layer of the capsules were also pounded and used on sores. It now has use in landscaping.
