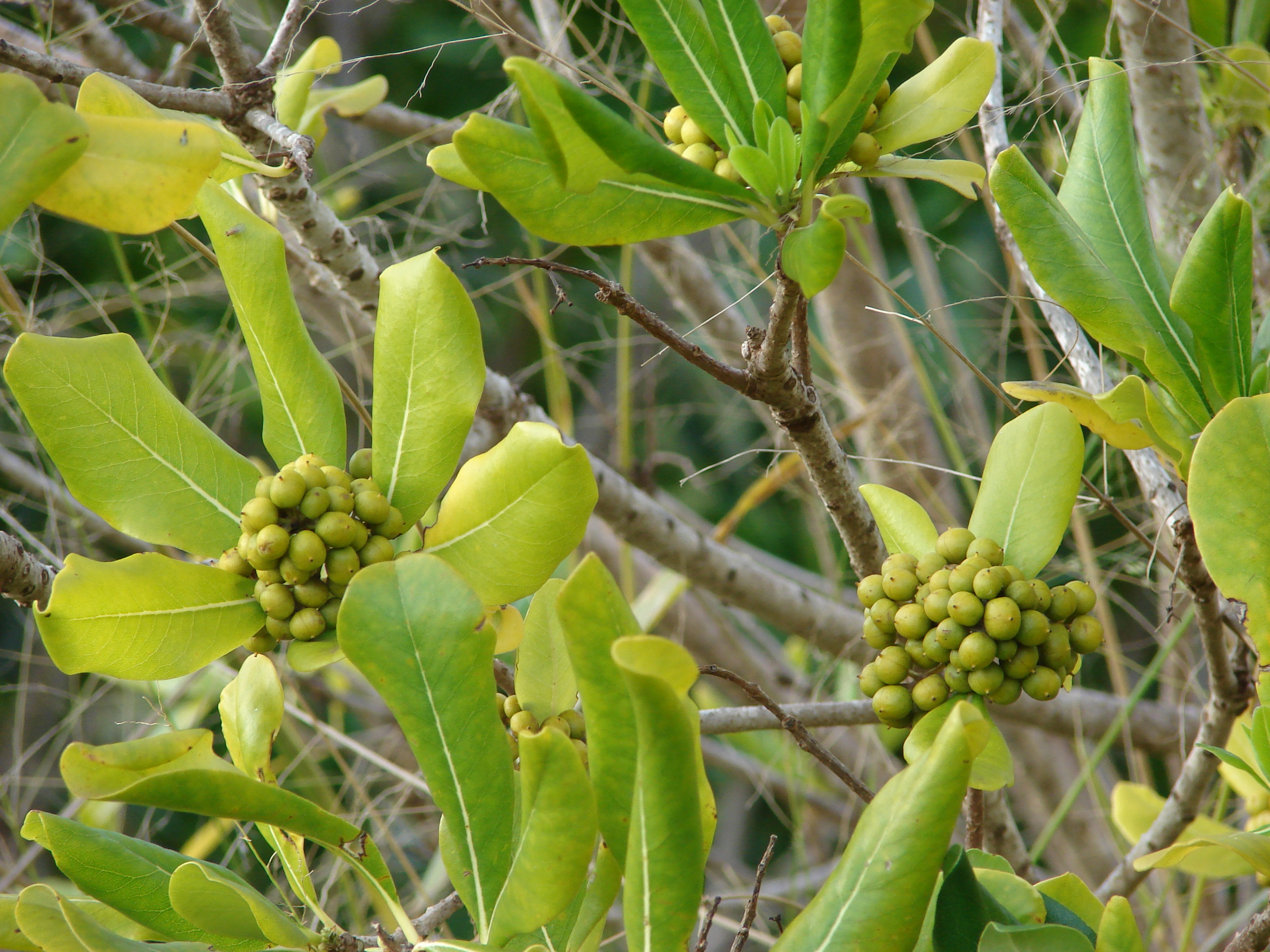

Scientific classification
- Kingdom: Plantae
- Clade: Tracheophytes
- Clade: Angiosperms
- Clade: Eudicots
- Clade: Asterids
- Order: Apiales
- Family: Pittosporaceae
- Genus: Pittosporum
- Species: P. viridiflorum

Binomial name
- Pittosporum viridiflorum Sims

= Pittosporum viridiflorum =

Species of tree

Pittosporum viridiflorum (Cape cheesewood, Afrikaans: Kasuur, Sotho: Kgalagangwe, Xhosa: Umkhwenkwe, Zulu: Umfusamvu) is a protected tree in South Africa.

== Morphology ==
The leaves are obovate with margin entire and wavy, conspicuous net veining, crowded at ends of branches. Often with a single mis-formed leaf. The midrib has a yellow colour and the leaf has a brilliant green colour when viewed against the light. Fruit borne in clusters at the end of branches, yellow becoming brown, dehiscent with four bright red seeds covered with a sticky exudate with a faintly sweet smell. The bark has brown lenticels.

== Distribution ==
Pittosporum viridiflorum ranges across Sub-Saharan Africa, mainly in the east from Ethiopia to South Africa and occasionally to the west. It is also found in Yemen and India.

== Habitat ==
Pittosporum viridiflorum is found in drier forest and evergreen bushland, rain forest, farmland derived from these vegetation types, bamboo forests, degraded Juniperus procera forest, riverine and swamp forest, humid woodland, and sometimes on rocky outcrops. It ranges from 650 to 2,600 meters elevation.

== See also ==
- List of Southern African indigenous trees
