= Pittosporum collinum =

Conservation status
- Vulnerable (IUCN 3.1)

Scientific classification
- Kingdom: Plantae
- Clade: Tracheophytes
- Clade: Angiosperms
- Clade: Eudicots
- Clade: Asterids
- Order: Apiales
- Family: Pittosporaceae
- Genus: Pittosporum
- Species: P. collinum

Binomial name
- Pittosporum collinum Guillaumin

Species of flowering plant

Pittosporum collinum is a species of plant in the Pittosporaceae family. It is endemic to New Caledonia.
