= Pittosporum divaricatum =

Scientific classification
- Kingdom: Plantae
- Clade: Tracheophytes
- Clade: Angiosperms
- Clade: Eudicots
- Clade: Asterids
- Order: Apiales
- Family: Pittosporaceae
- Genus: Pittosporum
- Species: P. divaricatum

Binomial name
- Pittosporum divaricatum Cockayne

Species of shrub

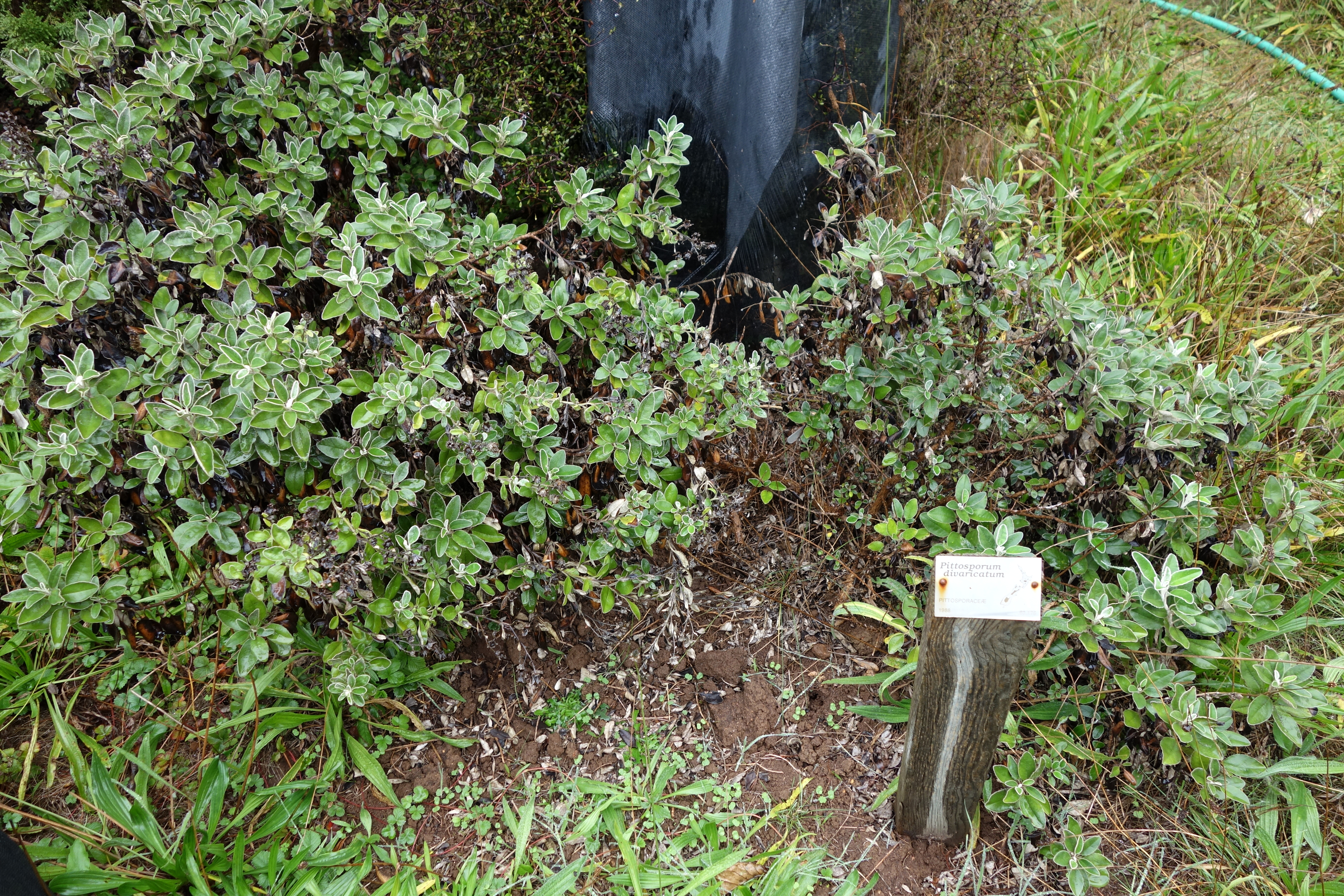
Botanical specimen in the UC Santa Cruz Arboretum at the University of California, Santa Cruz

Pittosporum divaricatum is a species of plant in the Pittosporaceae family. It is a New Zealand endemic shrub growing up to 3 metres high. It has densely entangled branches growing in a divaricating form typical of many New Zealand small leaved shrubs.

It exhibits a form of dimorphism with leaves differing in form between the juvenile and adult stages and in the adult leaves where two distinct forms are found. The juvenile leaves are narrowly lanceolate to obovate with margins pinnatifid to dentate. The adult leaves exist in two forms, either entire, or almost so, or deeply lobed or toothed. The flowers are borne singly on the end of shoots. The petal are up to 5mm long and very dark red, often appearing black, subtended by sepals which are 2mm long. The fruits contain between 2 and 6 seeds.
