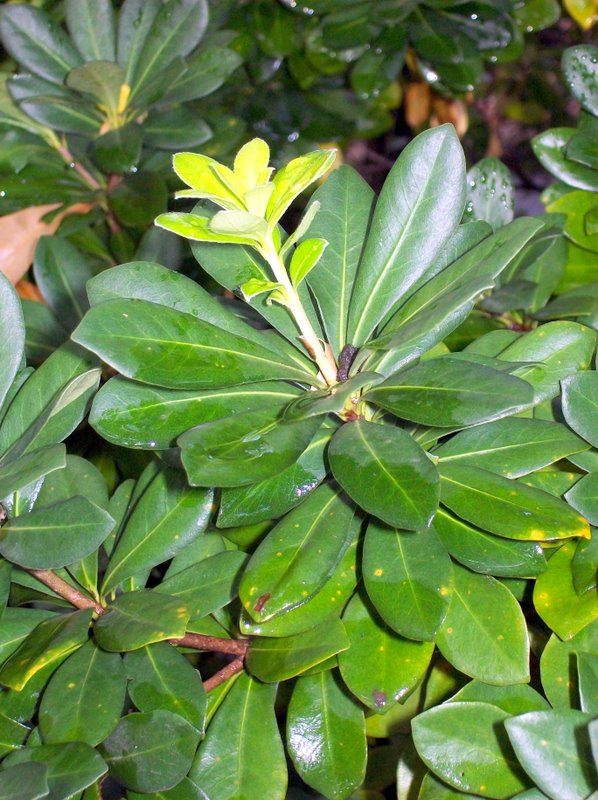

Scientific classification
- Kingdom: Plantae
- Clade: Tracheophytes
- Clade: Angiosperms
- Clade: Eudicots
- Clade: Asterids
- Order: Apiales
- Family: Pittosporaceae
- Genus: Pittosporum
- Species: P. erioloma

Binomial name
- Pittosporum erioloma C.Moore & F.Muell.

= Pittosporum erioloma =

Hedge laurel

Species of tree

Pittosporum erioloma grows as a shrub or small tree. It is also known as the Lord Howe Island pittosporum or hedge laurel, though it is not a member of the laurel family.

== Description ==
This plant grows up to 8 m in height. It has leaves that are 3.5-5 cm long, and 0.7-1.5 cm broad and narrowly obovate in shape. Flowering occurs from October to August. The petals creamy white with red or lilac at the base. The fruit capsule is 1.5 cm long, and contains a sticky pulp with many black seeds.

== Distribution and habitat ==
The species is endemic to Australia's Lord Howe Island in the Tasman Sea. It is found in habitats from 300 m above sea level, to the summits of Mount Gower and Mount Lidgbird. It prefers sunny areas on the margins of rainforest.
