= Pittosporum brevispinum =

Conservation status
- Critically Endangered (IUCN 3.1)

Scientific classification
- Kingdom: Plantae
- Clade: Tracheophytes
- Clade: Angiosperms
- Clade: Eudicots
- Clade: Asterids
- Order: Apiales
- Family: Pittosporaceae
- Genus: Pittosporum
- Species: P. brevispinum

Binomial name
- Pittosporum brevispinum Veillon & Tirel

Species of flowering plant

Pittosporum brevispinum is a species of plant in the Pittosporaceae family. It is endemic to New Caledonia.
