= Pittosporum virgatum =

Conservation status
- Near Threatened (IUCN 2.3)

Scientific classification
- Kingdom: Plantae
- Clade: Tracheophytes
- Clade: Angiosperms
- Clade: Eudicots
- Clade: Asterids
- Order: Apiales
- Family: Pittosporaceae
- Genus: Pittosporum
- Species: P. virgatum

Binomial name
- Pittosporum virgatum Kirk

Species of flowering plant

Pittosporum virgatum is a species of plant in the Pittosporaceae family. It is endemic to New Zealand.

== Brief Description ==
Slender small tree with whorls of branches and variably shaped leaves that are covered in rusty fuzz when young inhabiting the northern North Island. Flowers pink to purple. Leaves wavy, edge smooth or often lobed. Capsule splitting into two to show the black sticky seeds.

== Distribution ==
Endemic. New Zealand, North and Great Barrier islands, from the Mangamuka and Herekino Ranges south and east to Great Barrier and the Coromandel Peninsula. Reaching its southern limit at about the Kauaerange Valley (there are unconfirmed reports of its occurring slightly further south of there).

== Habitat ==
Usually associated with kauri (Agathis australis) forest, often on ridge lines, slips scars or in secondary regrowth within cut over kauri forest. Outside this forest type it is occasionally found in association with tanekaha (Phyllocladus trichomanoides), towai (Weinmannia silvicola) or kamahi (Weinmannia racemosa). In all situations it prefers relatively open vegetation, where it typically forms apparently evenly-aged cohorts.

== Features ==
Slender gynodioecious trees up to 8 m tall. Growth form initially narrowly columnar, becoming more spreading with age. Trunks slender grey brown, branches in distinct whorls in old specimens confined to the upper portion of the tree, bark brown, branchlets slender, pliant, brown at first covered with appressed rust-brown tomentum, soon glabrate. Petioles 1–7 x 0.5–1 mm, hairy. Leaves crowded toward branchlet ends, alternate; juvenile or lower leaves 10–40 x 1–7 mm, dark green or yellow-green, linear, entire or variously lobed, sometimes pinnate, both surfaces initially covered in rust-brown tomentum, soon glabrate; intermediate leaves 13–55 x 9–30 mm, lanceolate, narrowly linear, oblong or obovate, usually lobed or deeply divided both surfaces covered in rust-brown indumentum, soon glabrate; adult leaves 18–70 x 4–30 mm, oblong, oblanceolate, sometimes linear or linear-lanceolate, elliptic oblong, entire or sinuate, often lobed; margins flat to undulate. Flowers in 1-6-flowered, terminal fascicles, or solitary. Pedciels 5–9 mm, accrescent in fruit, covered in rust-brown indumentum, subtended by an approximate whorl of leaves, and 1–3 rust-tomentose caducous scales. Sepals 3.5–6.5 x 1–2.5 mm, oblong or linear-lanceolate, acute, rusty-brown tomentose. Petals 6–13 x 2–3 mm, linear-oblanceolate to linear-oblong, acute, fused in a tube for half of length, tips reflexed, dark red, purple, pink, white or golden yellow; stamens 4–7 mm, anthers sagittiform or oblong-ovate, ovary 2-4 x 1–2.5 mm, rusty-brown tomentose; style 1–5 mm, stigma capitate and obscurely 2-4-lobed. Capsules 11–16 x 10–13 mm, 2(-3)-valved, subglobose to subpyriform, apiculate, coriaceous. Mucilage bright yellow to orange-yellow. Seeds 1–16, dull black of irregular shape.

== Similar Taxa ==
The combination of the narrowly columnar to openly virgate growth form, widely spaced whorls of slender branches, extremely variable juvenile, intermediate and adult foliage types (often present on the one mature tree), and rusty-brown tomentose branchlets, leaves, and capsules are unique to this species. It could not be confused with any other.

== Flowering ==
September - November

== Flower Colours ==
Red/Pink, Violet/Purple

== Fruiting ==
July - August (may be present all year round)

== Propagation Technique ==
It can be propagated from fresh seed, which takes 6 to 12 months to germinate, and from semi-hardwood cuttings.

== Threats ==
Aside from Great Barrier Island where this species is abundant it appears to have always been a sporadically occurring local species of northern kauri dominated forests. While its current distribution suggests that it is biologically sparse, it is vulnerable to possum browsing and some populations were probably lost or reduced by kauri logging. Recent observation sin some parts of Northland that had been regarded as mainland stronghold suggest that this species is now seriously threatened. Pittosporum virgatum is likely to receive a higher threat listing in the near future.

== Etymology ==
pittosporum: Pitch seed
