= Pittosporum silamense =

Conservation status
- Vulnerable (IUCN 3.1)

Scientific classification
- Kingdom: Plantae
- Clade: Tracheophytes
- Clade: Angiosperms
- Clade: Eudicots
- Clade: Asterids
- Order: Apiales
- Family: Pittosporaceae
- Genus: Pittosporum
- Species: P. silamense

Binomial name
- Pittosporum silamense J.B. Sugau

Species of tree

Pittosporum silamense is a species of plant in the family Pittosporaceae. It is a tree endemic to Borneo where it is confined to Sabah.
