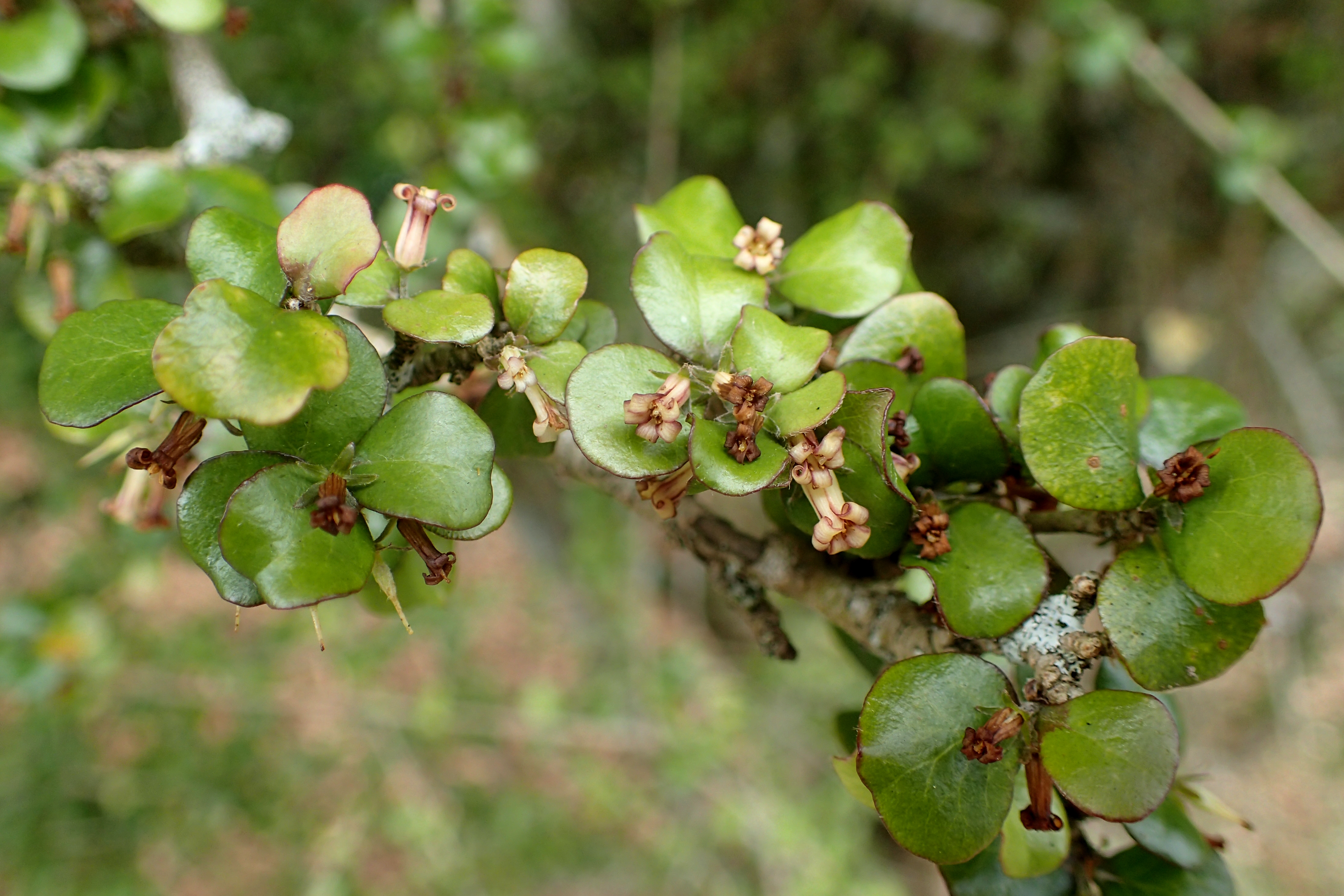

Conservation status
- Near Threatened (IUCN 2.3)

Scientific classification
- Kingdom: Plantae
- Clade: Tracheophytes
- Clade: Angiosperms
- Clade: Eudicots
- Clade: Asterids
- Order: Apiales
- Family: Pittosporaceae
- Genus: Pittosporum
- Species: P. obcordatum

Binomial name
- Pittosporum obcordatum Raoul

= Pittosporum obcordatum =

Species of flowering plant

Pittosporum obcordatum, commonly called heart-leaved kohuhu or heart-leaved kohukohu or kohukohu, is a species of plant in the Pittosporaceae family. It is endemic to New Zealand, and is found both in the North Island and the South Island.

Pittosporum obcordatum was discovered by Étienne Raoul in 1840 in Akaroa, but could then not be found again on Banks Peninsula for 170 years. It was rediscovered by Melissa Hutchison in 2012 in Okains Bay, and confirmed by local botanist Hugh Wilson.

== Etymology ==
'Pittosporum' means 'pitch seed', and the specific epithet 'obcordatum' means 'reversed heart shape'.

== Description ==
Pittosporum obcordatum is a dicotyledonous columnar single-trunked shrub or mostly <10 m tall small tree, with slender and interlacing branches, divaricating to many grey or reddish-brown, hairy or glabrous branchlets that bearing small woody capsules and scattered leaves.

=== Leaves ===
Pittosporum obcordatum have numerous, tomentulose or glabrous, margins entire or crenate, flat or revolute leaves, they have various shapes, usually 5–10 mm wide, mostly as long as wide. In different stage, leave are slight different, from size, shape, color to position on branchlets. seedling lamina: 5.0~10.0 ?2.5~8.0 mm; oblong, narrowly oblong, oblanceolate to elliptic, linear or spathulate; sometimes entire dark, brown-green, dark green, or mottled yellow-green; alternate on young branchlets; usually with apices deeply lobed; subadult lamina: 3.5~6.0 ?4.0~6.0 mm; oblong, obcordate-trilobate, narrowly oblong to elliptic, dark green to yellow-green, sometimes mottled; alternate on young branchlets or confined to the tips of brachyblasts;coriaceous or submembranous; adult lamina: 2.8~4.0 ?3.0~4.0 mm; orbicular, obovate, apex obcordate or obtuse; confined to the tips of brachyblasts; coriaceous.

=== Flowers ===
The colors of flowers are pink maroon or pale yellow, often with red-tinged margins, or striped red, 5~8 mm long, 1~5 flowered assemble to an umbellate; pedicels sparsely ciliolate, pubescent bracts. Sepals 1.5~3.0 ?0.5~1.0 mm, lanceolate-subulate, acute, ciliate, ovate-subulate; petals 4.0~6.5 ?0.7~1.5 mm, linear-oblong, obtuse to subacute lanceolate; night-fragrant, gynodioecious. The male flowers and females flowers are different: Male flowers: stamens 4, filaments 2.5~4.5 mm long, pink or yellow, anthers 0.5~1.0 mm long, yellow or pinkish yellow; gynoecium rudimentary or functional. Female flowers: stamens 4 rudimentary; ovary 1.5~3.3 ?0.5~1.5 mm, finely pubescent to hairy; style 1.0~1.2 mm long; stigma capitate, obscurely 2-lobed or truncate. Capsules 2-valved, 6.5~10.0 ?5.0~7.0 mm, ovoid, subovoid to ellipsoid, apiculate, green to black, coriaceous, weakly rugose, sparsely hairy, glabrate; mucilage yellow. Seeds 2–6, irregular, globose, lustrous dark black.

=== Fruits ===
Fruits is splitting into two, 6.5–10 mm long.

=== Similar taxa ===
Although Pittosporum obcordatum is easy recognize due to its special features, but it easy been confused with other small-leaved divaricating shrubs, such as Myrsine divaricata A.Cunn. However Myrsine divaricata have purple, fleshy fruits containing a single seed, and have a dark black blotch at the leaf base petiole junction.

== Distribution ==
Natural global range : New Zealand indigenous (endemic) species

New Zealand range : In about 1841, it was first discovered by E.Raoul near Akaroa. After that, the number of Pittosporum obcordatum reduce rapidly. In 1980, only three very small colonies in eastern North Island know this plant, the places are Wairoa, Tukituki River near Hastings, and Tauwhero River near Masterton. And in 1981, there were estimated to be fewer than 50 individuals in total in the 1981 Red Data Book of New Zealand. In 1994, the plant scattered along the length of New Zealand include 12 locations in 4 regions. And the total number of individuals in wild is about 2500, South Island took up about 60%, and two North Island localities (Mangarouhi, Waipukurau and Wairua, Whangarei) have more than 300 individuals. Pittosporum obcordatum also been found in Paengaroa Mainland Island.

== Habitat ==
Pittosporum obcordatum prefer lowland kahikatea/matai forest, terrestrial, or eastern lowland alluvial forest. According to Clarkson & Clarkson (1994) ecological investigations in North Island's six locations, Pittosporum obcordatum prefers habitat is river flats, usually "near backswamps and margins of oxbow lakes and cut-off meanders", with <200 meters altitude, 9–15 degree Celsius mean annual temperatures, 1000 mm~1500 mm mean annual rainfall and frequent raining in winter and drought summer. Pittosporum obcordatum also found in primary and secondary forest, treeland, and scrub which usually dominated by Dacrycarpus dacrydioides and/or Prumnopitys taxifolia with abundance and diversity of divaricating shrubs or trees. So it can be seen as a health-indicator species of divaricate-rich vegetation.

== Life cycle/phenology ==
Pittosporum obcordatum grows very slow as a lowland small trees and shrubs and be estimated has a maximum lifespan of 120 years (Clarkson & Clarkson, 1994). According to Clarkson & Clarkson's (1994) ecological investigations in North Island's six locations, new season's vegetative growth begins at epigeal germination from the last week of August to October; after germination, the new plants reveal 3~4 cotyledonary leaves, followed by juvenile leaves. According to the seedling emerged time, first juvenile leaves appear in different time, if seedlings that emerged in mid summer, first juvenile leaves appeared after 5–7 days. However, for some seedlings that emerged in late autumn remained, there may be no juvenile leaves or an arrested juvenile leaf until the following spring.

Pittosporum obcordatum (2n=24) is dioecious, which means male plants contribute genes to next generation by pollen only, female plants pass on genes only via ovules. However, some males or females plants (6.6%) occasionally produce few seed capsules and become inconstant males or inconstant females. And about late September to early December the plant flowering and lasting about 3 weeks, but population in different altitude and latitude have slight different flowing time, for example, higher altitude and more inland plants flowering slightly later. December to May fruiting and the fruits and persist for a long time.

== Predators and threats ==
Pittosporum obcordatum has a low genetic diversity due to a bottleneck effect. Flooding in pre-European times may have contributed to new establishments of P. obcordatum. Deforestation and predation have also caused numbers to drop.

Pittosporum obcordatum is currently a threatened plant. This is largely due to deforestation, browsing mammals, and invasive weeds that take over its habitat. Weeds such Carex divulsa as suffocate P. obcordatum, making it difficult for the plant to regenerate.

== Conservation ==
As well as 54 indigenous species, P. obcordatum is currently defined as "nationally endangered. There are some recommendations to ensuring that P. obcordatum does not go extinct. As previously mentioned the removal of invasive species such as Carex divulsa would allow P. obcordatum to regenerate. Fencing areas where P. obcordatum grows would also help to preserve plants.

== Cultural uses ==
Pittosporum obcordatum has been documented to have medicinal uses. It has been used as a salve to soothe eczema of the scalp and has also been recorded to have been used for scabies. Certain parts of P. obcordatum would be dried in the sun and then pounded, producing a powder. The powder would be mixed with hinu-kōhia oil to form a salve.
