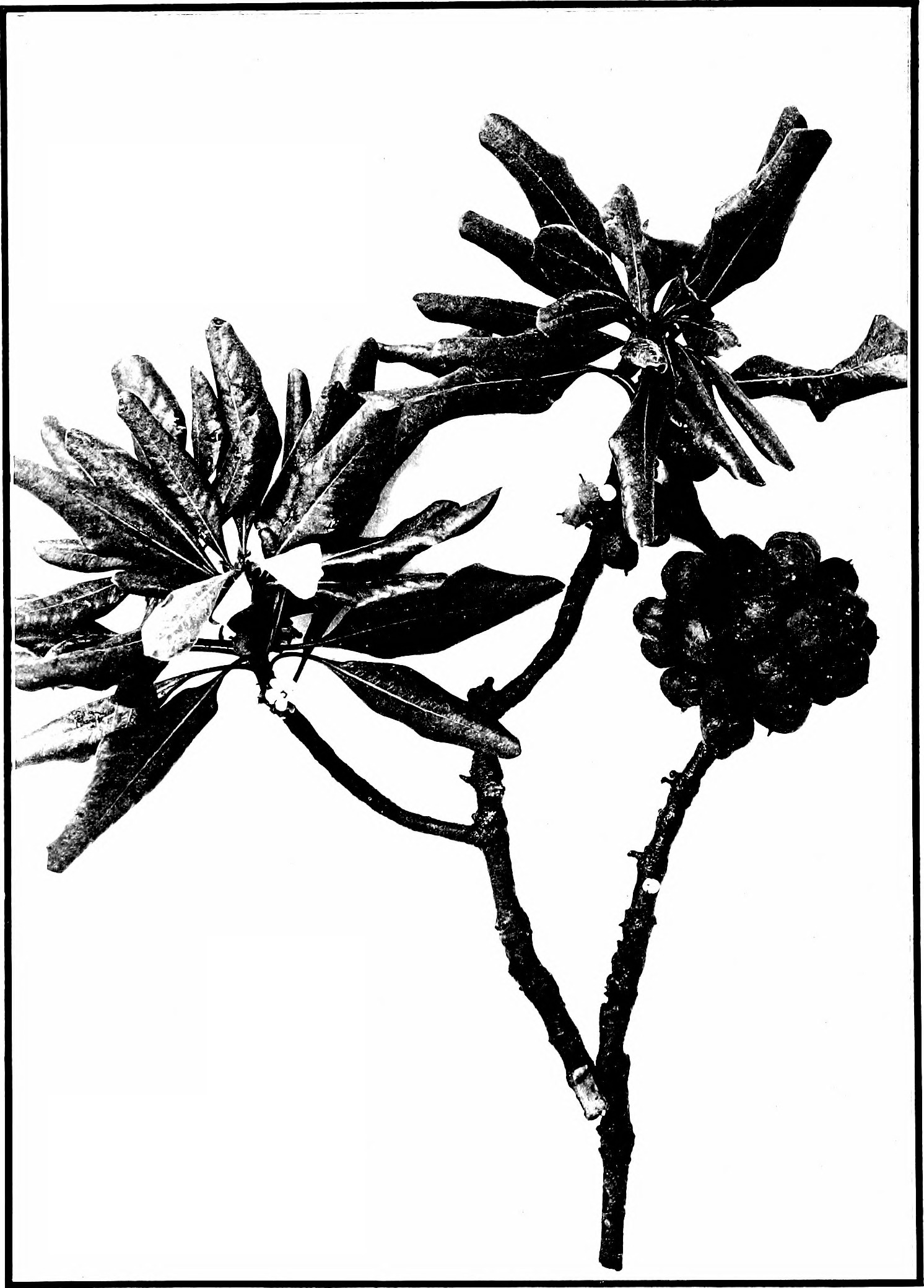

Conservation status
- Vulnerable (IUCN 2.3)

Scientific classification
- Kingdom: Plantae
- Clade: Embryophytes
- Clade: Tracheophytes
- Clade: Spermatophytes
- Clade: Angiosperms
- Clade: Eudicots
- Clade: Asterids
- Order: Apiales
- Family: Pittosporaceae
- Genus: Pittosporum
- Species: P. terminalioides

Binomial name
- Pittosporum terminalioides Planch. ex Gray

= Pittosporum terminalioides =

Species of flowering plant

Pittosporum terminalioides, the cream cheesewood, is a species of plant in the Pittosporaceae family. It is endemic to Hawaii. It is threatened by habitat loss.
