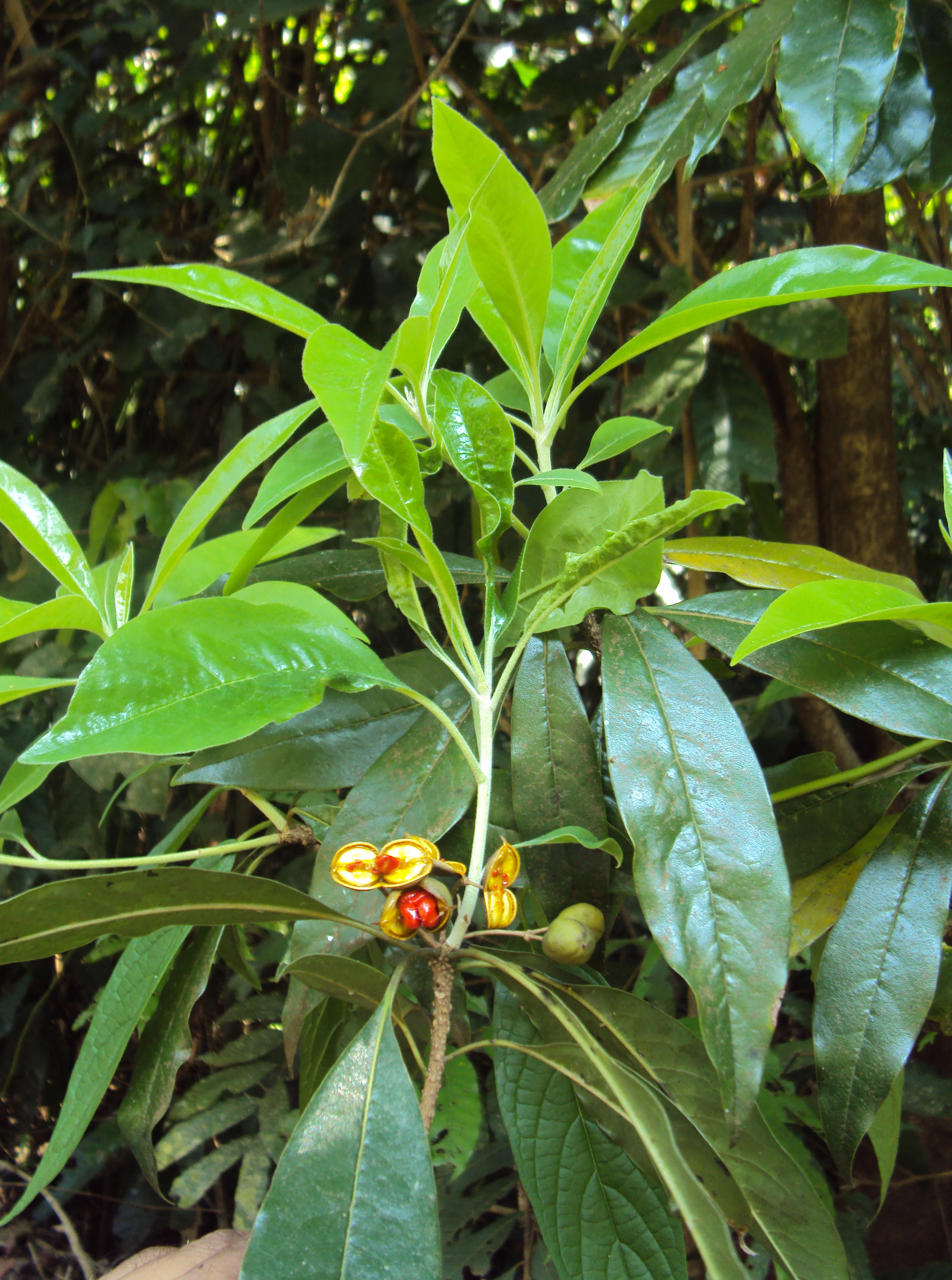
- Leaves and fruits

Scientific classification
- Kingdom: Plantae
- Clade: Tracheophytes
- Clade: Angiosperms
- Clade: Eudicots
- Clade: Asterids
- Order: Apiales
- Family: Pittosporaceae
- Genus: Pittosporum
- Species: P. dasycaulon

Binomial name
- Pittosporum dasycaulon Miq.

= Pittosporum dasycaulon =

Species of tree

Pittosporum dasycaulon is a small tree up to 8 meters endemic to the Western Ghats of India.
