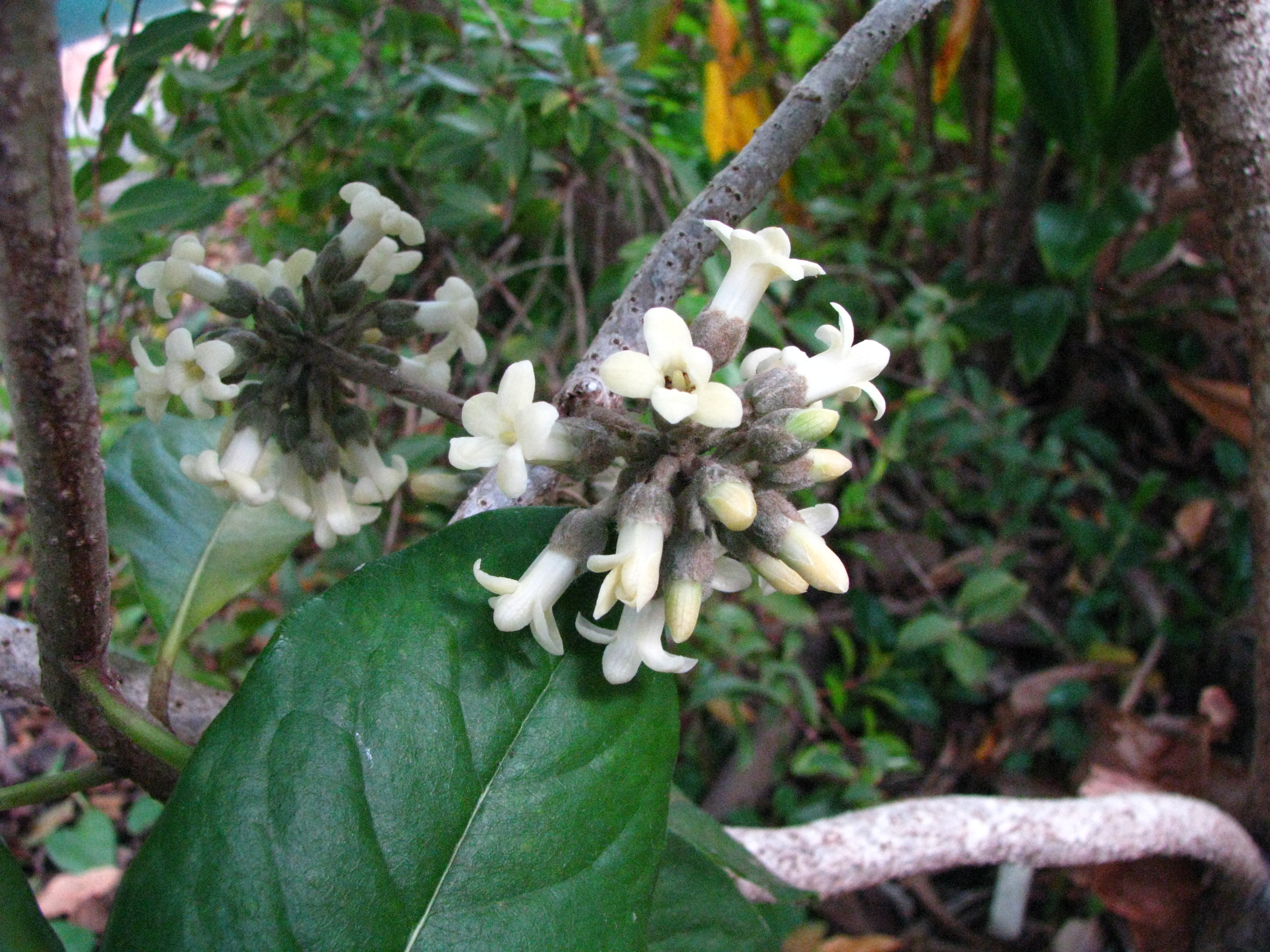

Conservation status
- Critically Endangered (IUCN 3.1)

Scientific classification
- Kingdom: Plantae
- Clade: Tracheophytes
- Clade: Angiosperms
- Clade: Eudicots
- Clade: Asterids
- Order: Apiales
- Family: Pittosporaceae
- Genus: Pittosporum
- Species: P. napaliense

Binomial name
- Pittosporum napaliense Sherff

= Pittosporum napaliense =

Species of flowering plant

Pittosporum napaliense, the royal cheesewood, is a species of plant in the Pittosporaceae family. It is endemic to Hawaii, where it is known only from northwestern Kauai. It became a federally listed endangered species in 2010.
