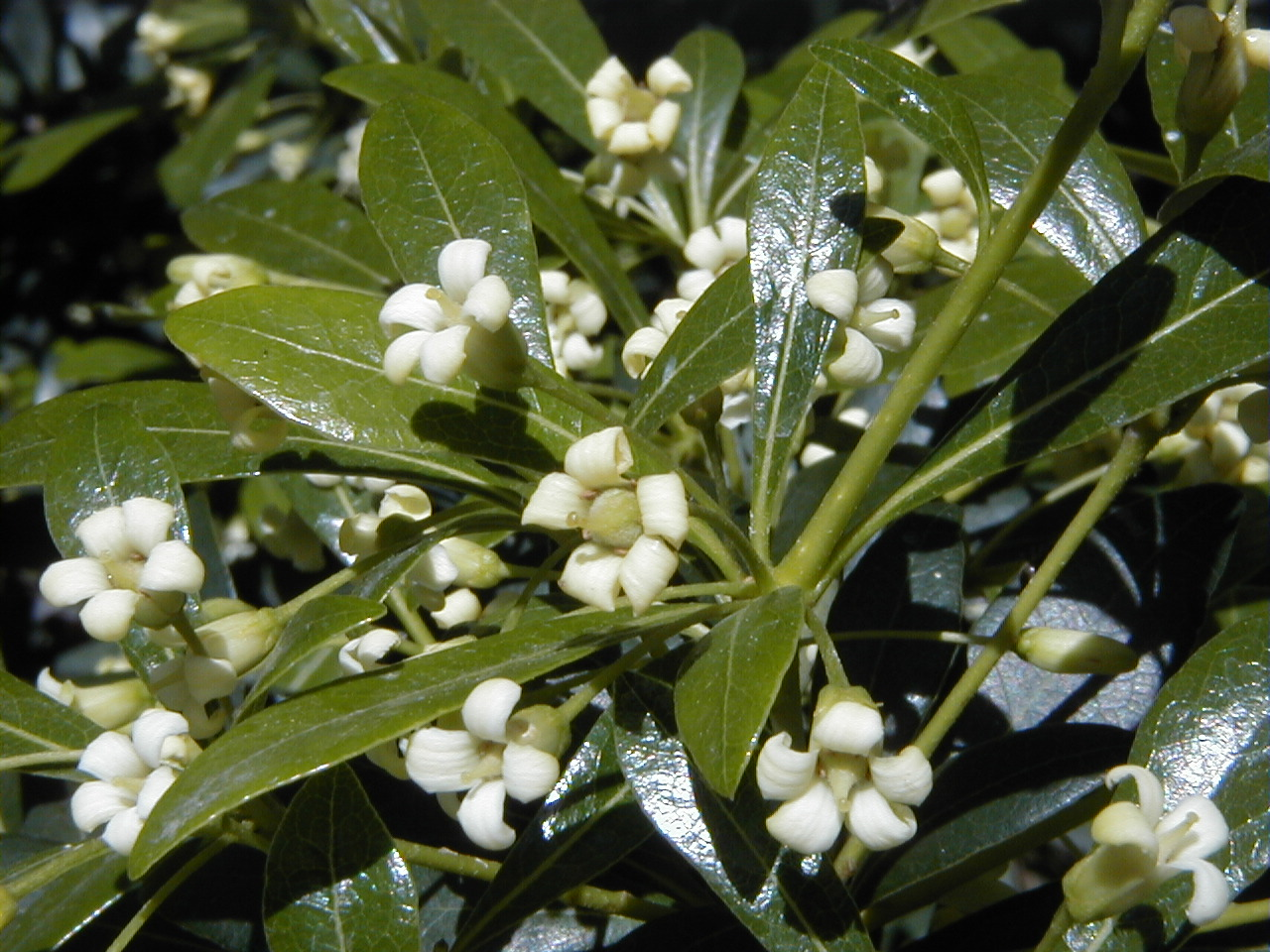
- Pittosporum heterophyllum

Scientific classification
- Kingdom: Plantae
- Clade: Tracheophytes
- Clade: Angiosperms
- Clade: Eudicots
- Clade: Asterids
- Order: Apiales
- Family: Pittosporaceae
- Genus: Pittosporum; Banks ex Gaertn.

Diversity
- c. 250 species

Synonyms
- Citriobatus A.Cunn. & Putt.; Cylbanida Noronha ex Tul.; Glyaspermum Zoll. & Moritzi; Ixiosporum F.Muell.; Pittosporoides Sol. ex Gaertn.; Pseuditea Hassk.; Quinsonia Montrouz.; Schoutensia Endl.; Tobira Adans.

= Pittosporum =

Genus of flowering plants

Pittosporum (/pɪˈtɒspərəm/ or /ˌpɪtəˈspɔːrəm, -toʊ-/) is a genus of about 250 species of flowering plants in the family Pittosporaceae. Plants in the genus Pittosporum are shrubs or trees with leaves arranged alternately along the stems. The flowers are arranged singly or in cymes, with white to yellow petals fused at the base forming a short tube, with stamens that are free from each other. The fruit is a capsule with a single locule that opens to reveal angular seeds.

== Description ==
Plants in the genus Pittosporum are shrubs or trees, occasionally spiny, with smooth-edged linear to lance-shaped or egg-shaped leaves with the narrower end towards the base, on a petiole. The flowers are borne on the ends of branches or in leaf axils, in cymes or clusters with sepals that are free from each other. The petals are linear or lance-shaped with the narrower end towards the base, and partly fused to form a tube. The anthers are shorter than the filaments and open by two longitudinal slits. The fruit is a woody or leathery capsule containing seeds immersed in a sticky fluid.

== Taxonomy ==
The genus Pittosporum was first formally described in 1788 by Joseph Gaertner in De Fructibus et Seminibus Plantarum from an unpublished description by Joseph Banks. The genus name (Pittosporum) is made from the Greek words πίττα (pίtta) 'pitch, tar' and σπόρος (spóros) 'seed', so 'pitch seed', referring to the viscid fluid surrounding the seeds.

== Distribution ==
Plants in the genus Pittosporum are native to some parts of southern Africa, Madagascar, Saudi Arabia, Yemen, Pakistan, India, some parts of China, Korea, Japan, Southeast Asia, New Guinea, Australia, New Zealand, and some Pacific Islands.

== Selected species ==
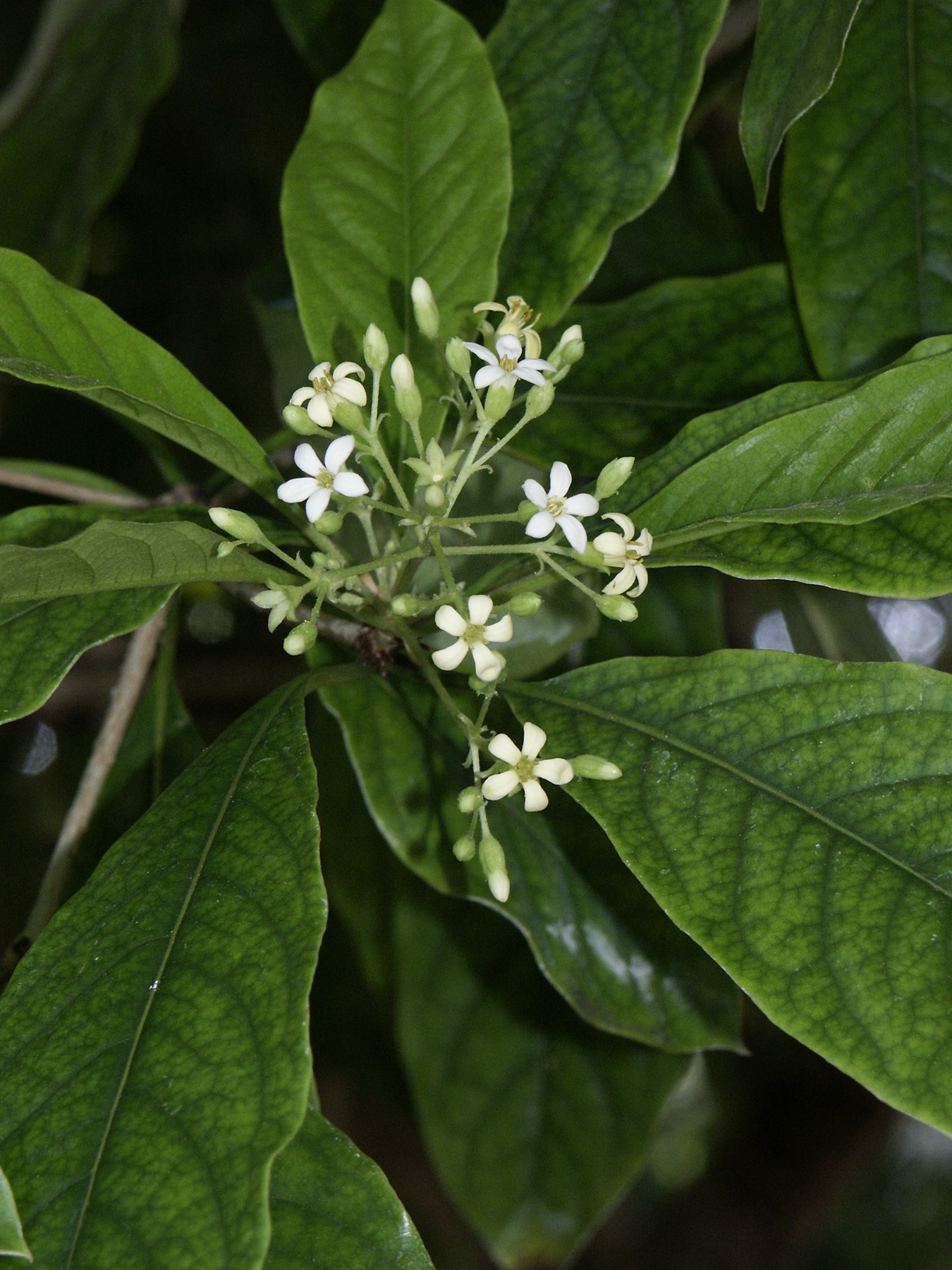
Pittosporum moluccanum

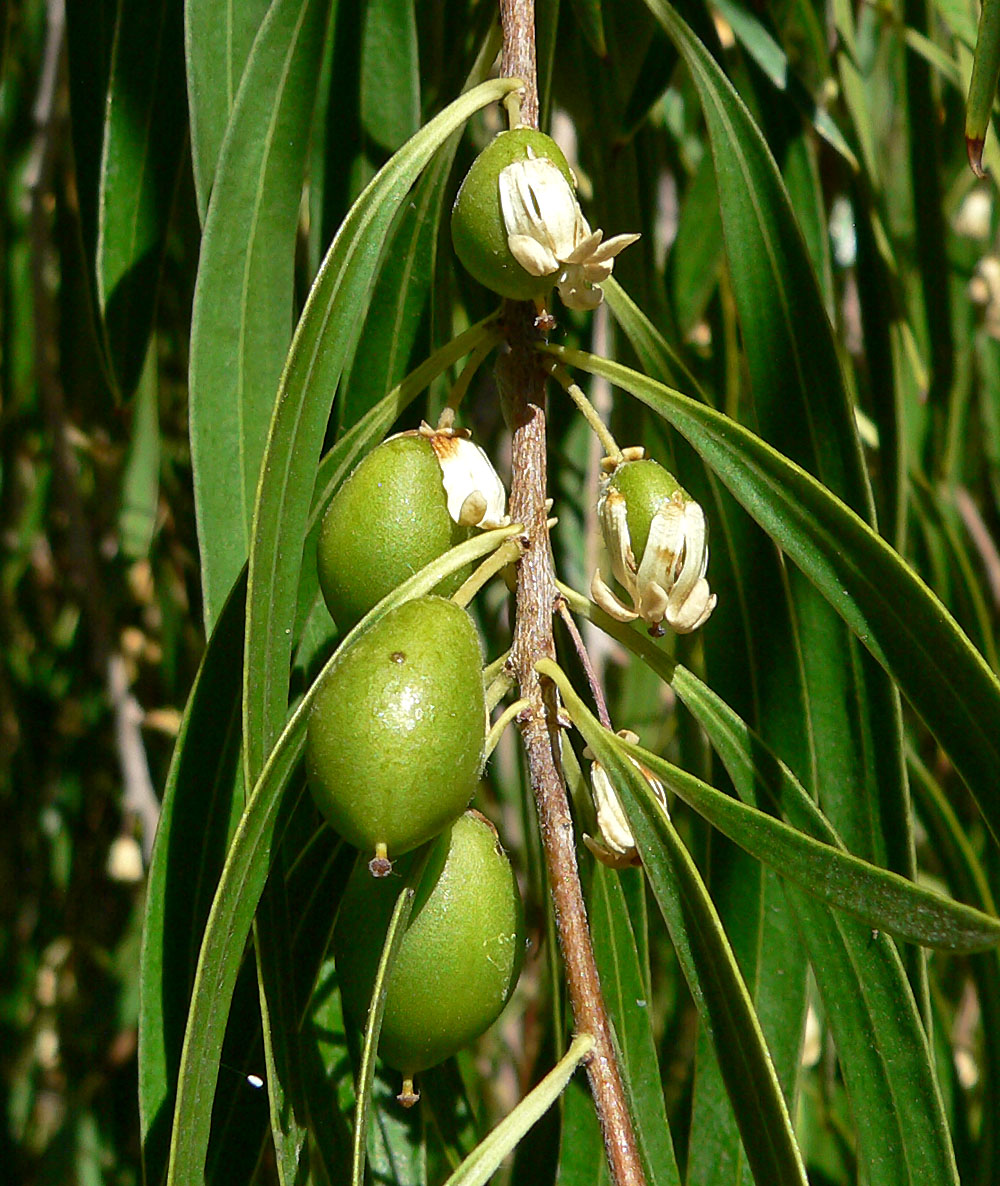
Fruiting branch of weeping pittosporum (Pittosporum phillyreoides)

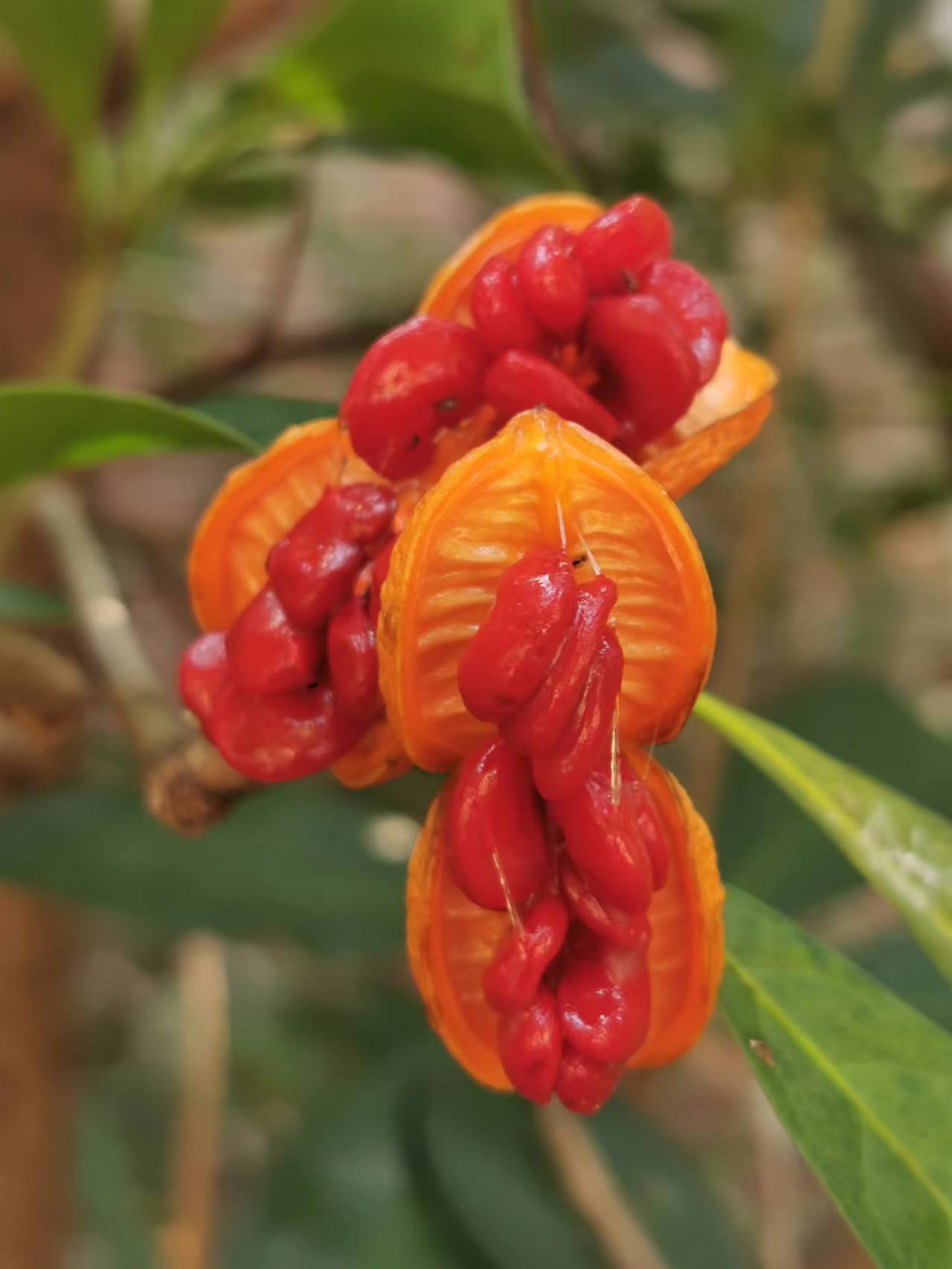
Pittosporum moluccanum

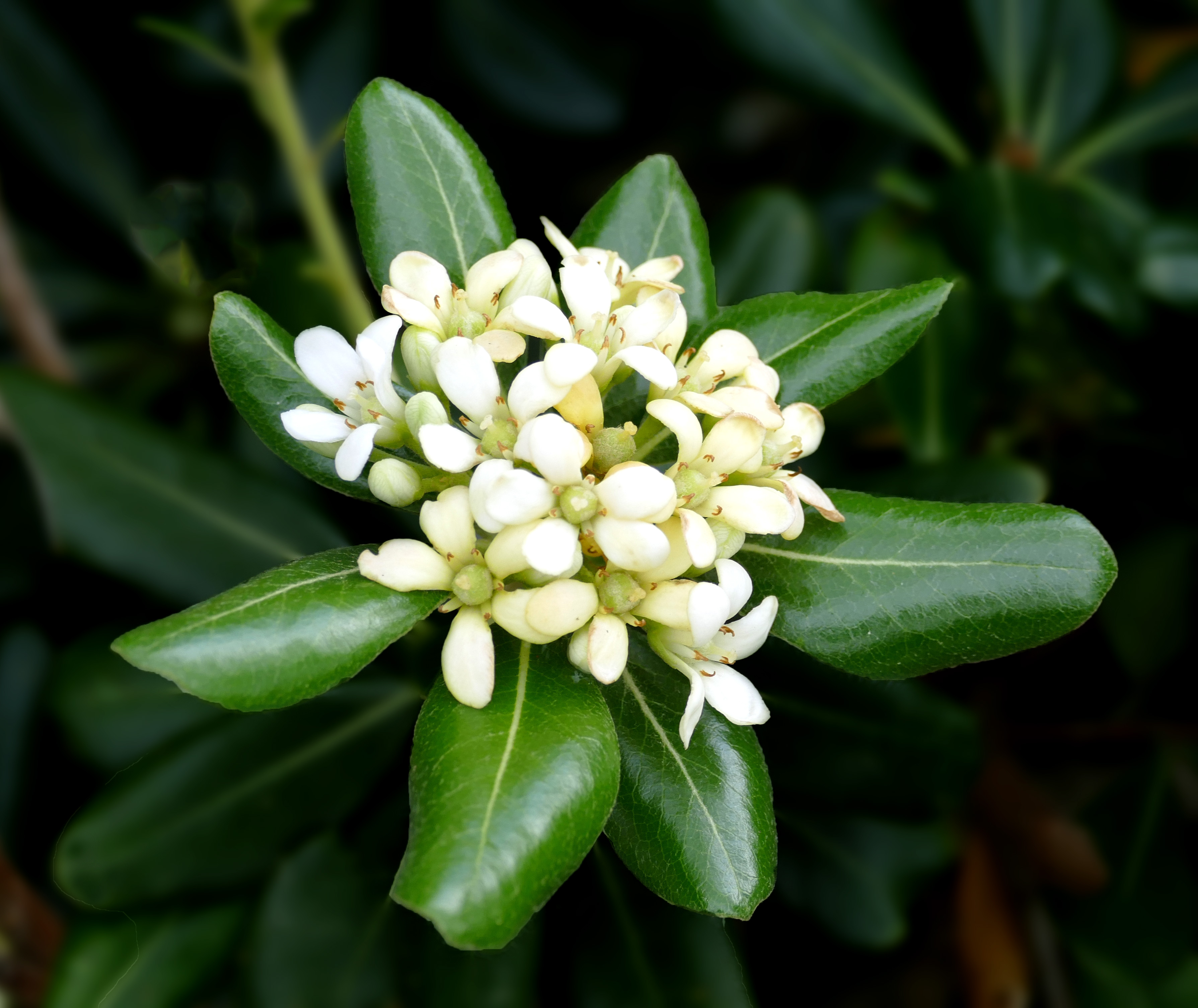
Japanese cheesewood (Pittosporum tobira)

- Pittosporum aliferum Tirel & Veillon
- Pittosporum angustifolium
- Pittosporum artense Guillaumin
- Pittosporum bicolor
- Pittosporum brevispinum
- Pittosporum ceylanicum
- Pittosporum coccineum
- Pittosporum collinum
- Pittosporum coriaceum
- Pittosporum cornifolium – tāwhiri karo
- Pittosporum crassifolium – karo
- Pittosporum dallii
- Pittosporum dasycaulon
- Pittosporum divaricatum
- Pittosporum eriocarpum
- Pittosporum erioloma
- Pittosporum eugenioides A. Cunn. – tarata, lemonwood (New Zealand)
- Pittosporum fairchildii
- Pittosporum ferrugineum
- Pittosporum gatopense
- Pittosporum goetzei
- Pittosporum gomonenense
- Pittosporum heterophyllum
- Pittosporum hosmeri – Kona cheesewood
- Pittosporum kirkii – Kirk's pittosporum, Kirk's kōhūhū, thick-leaved kohukohu
- Pittosporum koghiense
- Pittosporum lancifolium
- Pittosporum linearifolium
- Pittosporum mackeei Tirel & Veillon (Ponérihouen area of New Caledonia)
- Pittosporum moluccanum
- Pittosporum multiflorum
- Pittosporum muricatum
- Pittosporum napaliense
- Pittosporum obcordatum – heart-leaved kohuhu
- Pittosporum oreillyanum – O'Reilly's pittosporum
- Pittosporum ornatum
- Pittosporum orohenense
- Pittosporum paniense
- Pittosporum patulum
- Pittosporum pauciflorum
- Pittosporum pentandrum
- Pittosporum phillyreoides – weeping pittosporum, willow pittosporum, butterbush, native apricot
- Pittosporum pickeringii
- Pittosporum raivavaeense
- Pittosporum ramiflorum
- Pittosporum rapense
- Pittosporum rarotongense
- Pittosporum resiniferum – petroleum nut
- Pittosporum revolutum – rough-fruited pittosporum, wild yellow jasmine, yellow pittosporum, Brisbane laurel
- Pittosporum rhytidocarpum
- Pittosporum rubiginosum
- Pittosporum senacia
- Pittosporum silamense
- Pittosporum spinescens
- Pittosporum taitense
- Pittosporum tanianum
- Pittosporum tenuifolium – kōhūhū, kohukohu, black matipo (New Zealand)
- Pittosporum terminalioides
- Pittosporum tobira (Murray) Aiton fil. – Japanese cheesewood, Japanese mock orange (Japan, China, and Korea)
- Pittosporum turneri
- Pittosporum umbellatum – haekaro (New Zealand)
- Pittosporum undulatum – sweet pittosporum, Australian cheesewood, native daphne, mock orange (east coast of Australia)
- Pittosporum virgatum
- Pittosporum viridulum
- Pittosporum viridiflorum
- Pittosporum wingii
