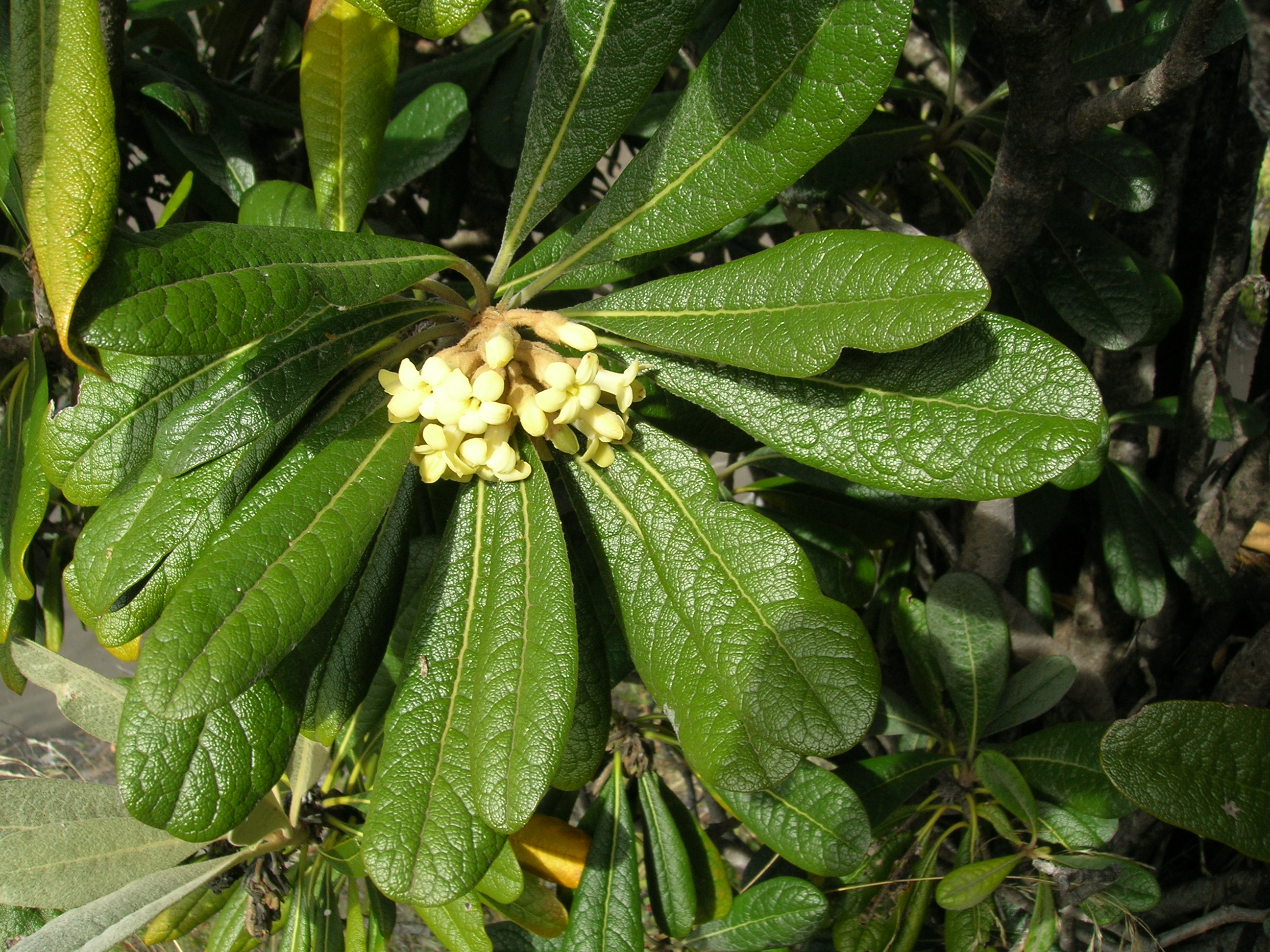
- Hōʻawa (Pittosporum confertiflorum)

Scientific classification
- Kingdom: Plantae
- Clade: Tracheophytes
- Clade: Angiosperms
- Clade: Eudicots
- Clade: Asterids
- Order: Apiales
- Family: Pittosporaceae; R.Br.

Genera
- See text.

Diversity
- 9 genera

= Pittosporaceae =

Family of flowering plants

Pittosporaceae is a family of flowering plants that consists of 200–240 species of trees, shrubs, and lianas in 9 genera. Habitats range from tropical to temperate climates of the Afrotropical, Indomalayan, Oceanian, and Australasian realms. The type genus is Pittosporum Banks ex Gaertn.

== Description ==
Pittosporaceae are dioecious trees, shrubs, or twining vines, with leaves having pinnate venation, no stipules, and margins that are smooth. Ovaries are superior, often with parietal placentation. The style is undivided and straight, and the stigma is often lobed. The fruit is a capsule or berry with the calyx being shed from the fruit. The seeds are surrounded by sticky pulp that comes from secretions of the placental hairs. The flowers have equal numbers of sepals, petals and stamens.

== Genera ==
As of January 2023, the following nine genera are placed within this family as accepted by Plants of the World Online:

- Auranticarpa L.W.Cayzer, Crisp & I.Telford
- Bentleya E.M.Benn.
- Billardiera Sm.
- Bursaria Cav.
- Cheiranthera A.Cunn. ex Lindl.
- Hymenosporum R.Br. ex F.Muell. (H. flavum being the sole species)
- Marianthus Hügel
- Pittosporum Banks ex Gaertn.
- Rhytidosporum F.Muell.
