= List of Pittosporum species =

Pittosporum is a genus of plants in the family Pittosporaceae. As of September 2024, Plants of the World Online accepted 253 species.

== A ==
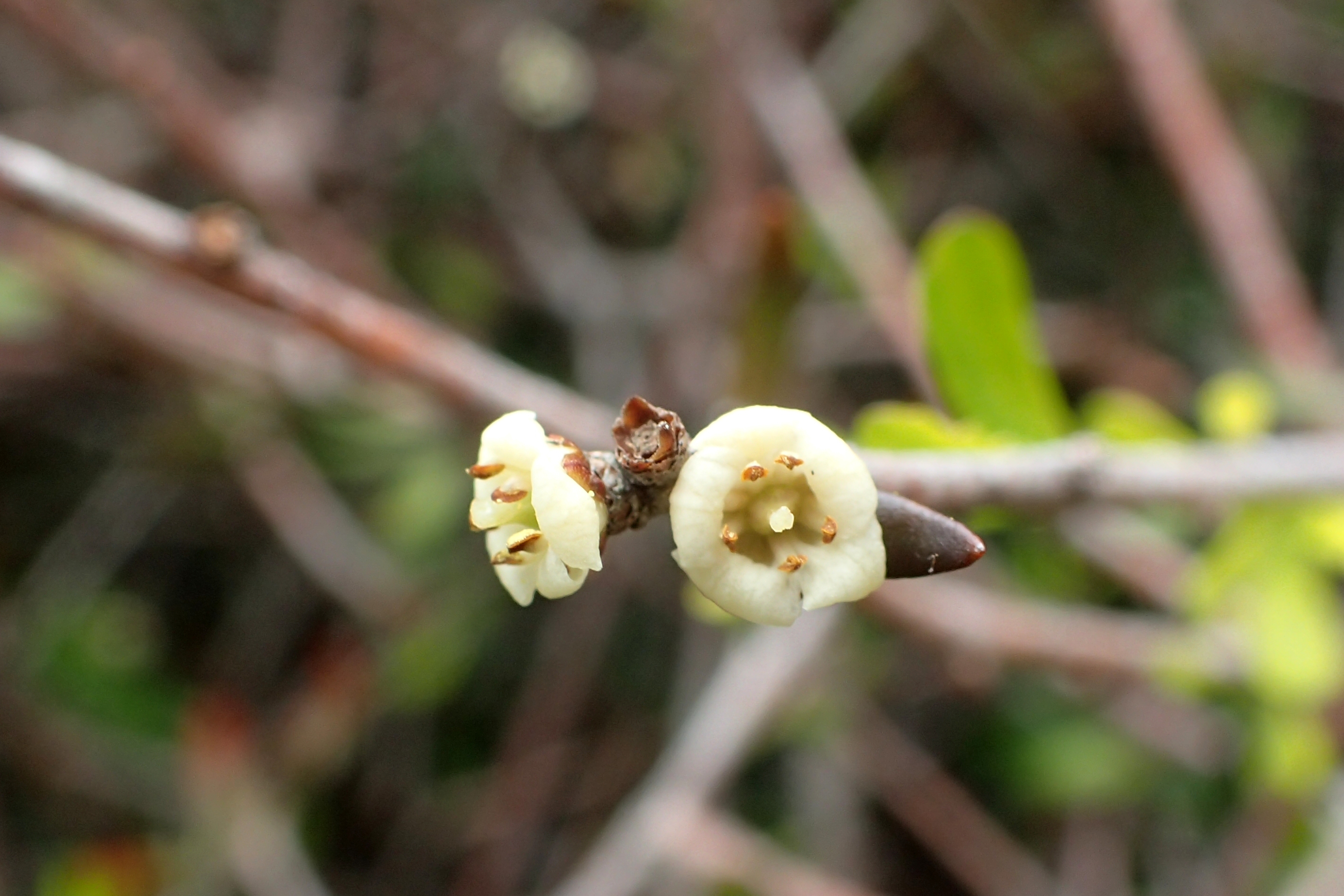
Pittosporum anomalum

- Pittosporum abyssinicum Delile
- Pittosporum acuminatissimum Merr.
- Pittosporum aliferum Tirel & Veillon
- Pittosporum ambrense Cufod.
- Pittosporum anamallayense M.P.Nayar & G.S.Giri
- Pittosporum aneityense Guillaumin
- Pittosporum anggiense D.M.Hicks & Utteridge
- Pittosporum angustifolium G.Lodd.
- Pittosporum angustilimbum C.Y.Wu
- Pittosporum anomalum Laing & Gourlay
- Pittosporum arborescens Rich. ex A.Gray
- Pittosporum argentifolium Sherff
- Pittosporum artense Guillaumin

== B ==
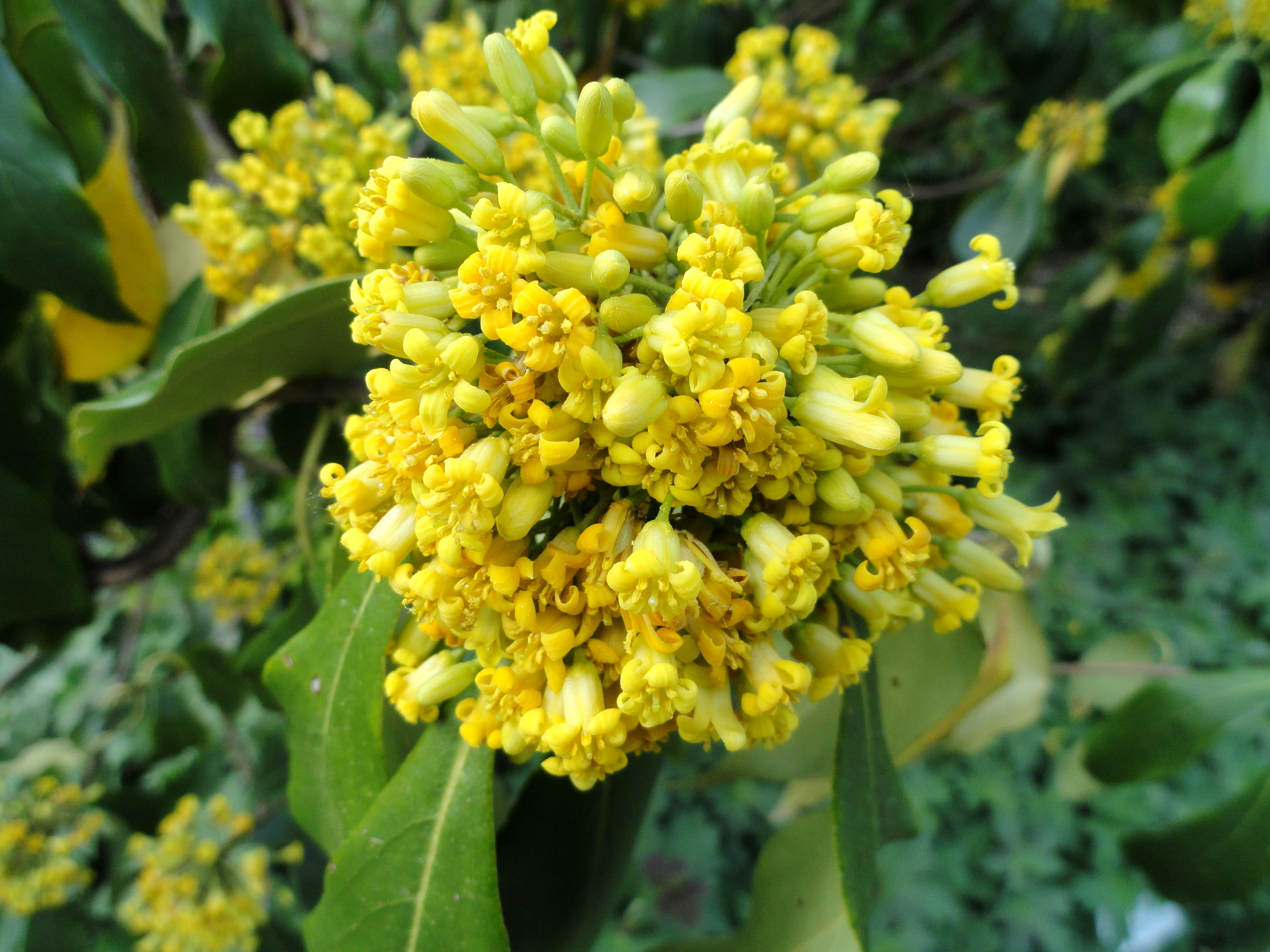
Pittosporum brevicalyx

- Pittosporum balansae Aug.DC.
- Pittosporum balfourii Cufod.
- Pittosporum baudouinii Brongn. & Gris
- Pittosporum berberidoides Burkill
- Pittosporum bernardii Tirel & Veillon
- Pittosporum bicolor Hook.
- Pittosporum boninense Koidz.
- Pittosporum bouletii Veillon & Tirel
- Pittosporum brackenridgei A.Gray
- Pittosporum bracteolatum Endl.
- Pittosporum brevicalyx (Oliv.) Gagnep.
- Pittosporum brevispinum Veillon & Tirel
- Pittosporum buchananii Hook.f.
- Pittosporum bullatoferrugineum Cufod.

== C ==
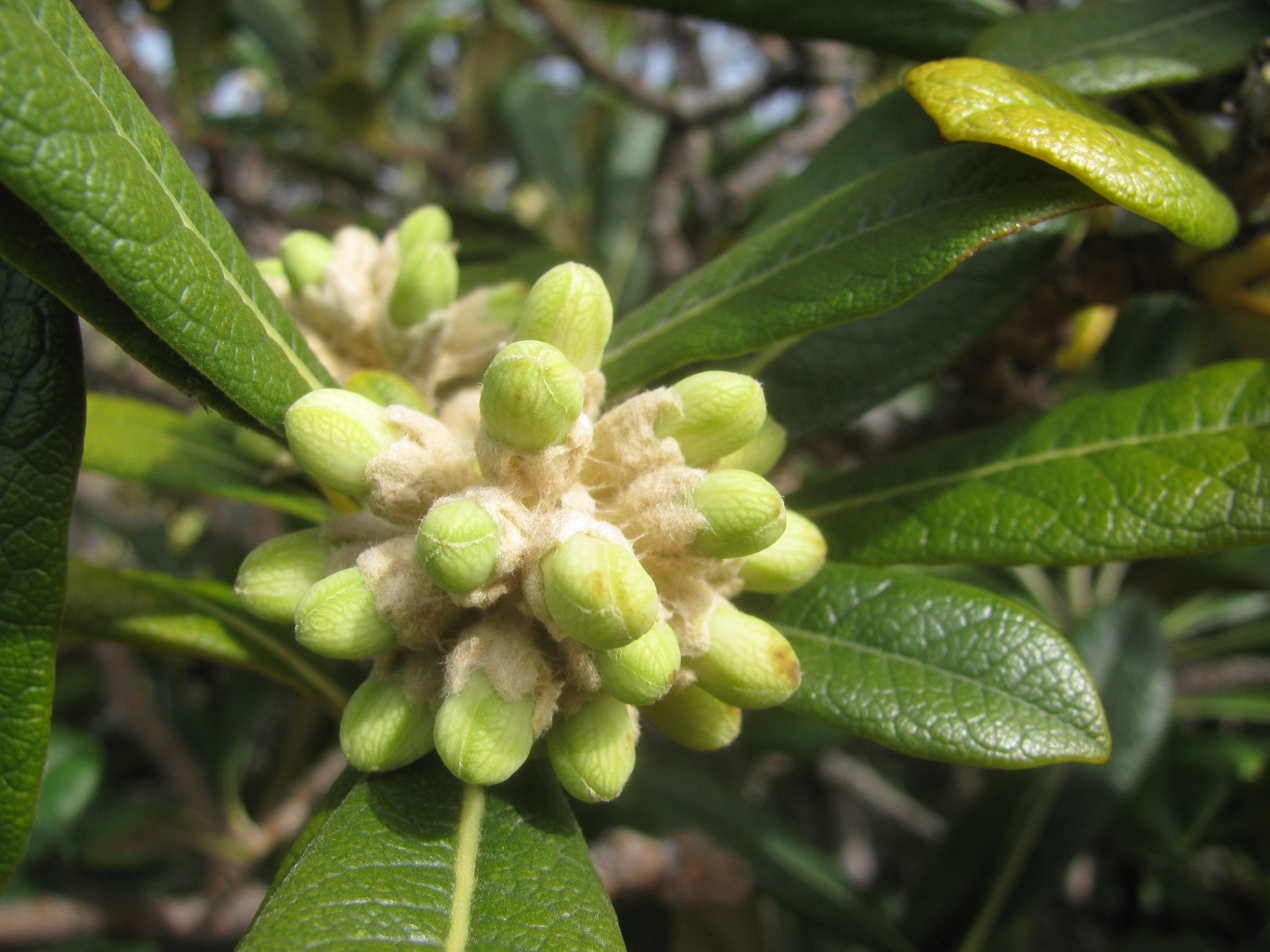
Pittosporum confertiflorum

- Pittosporum cacondense Exell & Mendonça
- Pittosporum campbellii F.Muell.
- Pittosporum ceylanicum Wight
- Pittosporum chelidospermum Blume
- Pittosporum cherrieri Tirel & Veillon
- Pittosporum clementis Merr.
- Pittosporum coccineum (Montrouz.) Beauvis.
- Pittosporum colensoi Hook.f.
- Pittosporum collinum Guillaumin
- Pittosporum comptum K.Schum. & Lauterb.
- Pittosporum confertiflorum A.Gray
- Pittosporum coriaceum Aiton
- Pittosporum cornifolium A.Cunn. ex Hook.
- Pittosporum crassicaule Laing & Gourlay
- Pittosporum crassifolium Banks & Sol.
- Pittosporum cravenianum Schodde
- Pittosporum crispulum Gagnep.
- Pittosporum croceum Guillaumin

== D ==
- Pittosporum dallii Cheeseman
- Pittosporum daphniphylloides Hayata
- Pittosporum dasycaulon Miq.
- Pittosporum densiflorum Putt.
- Pittosporum deplanchei Brongn. & Gris
- Pittosporum divaricatum Cockayne
- Pittosporum dzumacense Guillaumin

== E ==
- Pittosporum echinatum Brongn. & Gris
- Pittosporum elevaticostatum H.T.Chang & S.Z.Yan
- Pittosporum ellipticum Kirk
- Pittosporum epiphyticum Merr.
- Pittosporum eriocarpum Royle
- Pittosporum erioloma C.Moore & F.Muell.
- Pittosporum eugenioides A.Cunn.
- Pittosporum euphlebium Merr.

== F ==
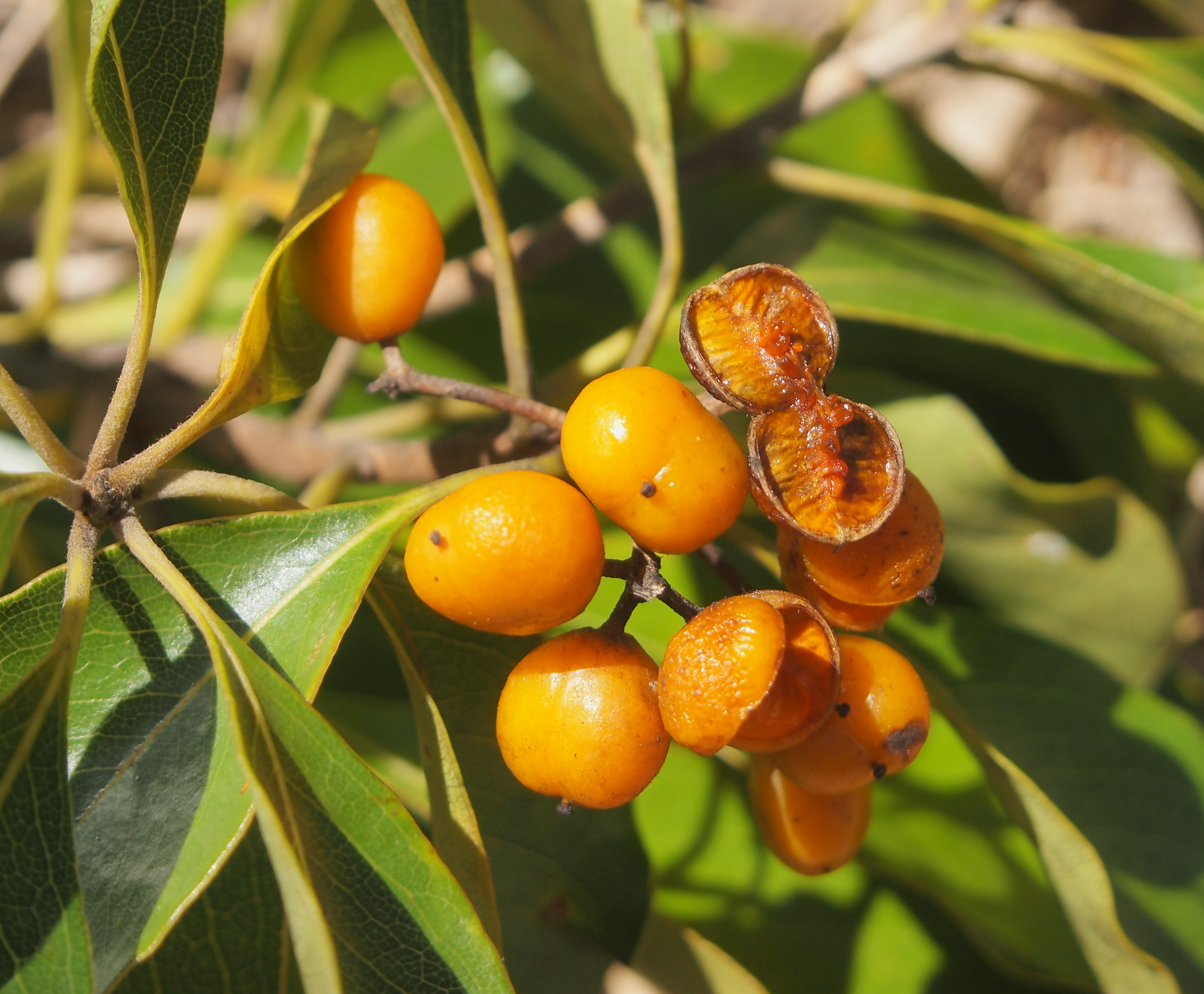
Pittosporum ferrugineum

- Pittosporum fairchildii Cheeseman
- Pittosporum ferrugineum W.T.Aiton
- Pittosporum fissicalyx Miq.
- Pittosporum flocculosum (Hillebr.) Sherff
- Pittosporum fulvipilosum H.T.Chang & S.Z.Yan
- Pittosporum fulvotomentosum Engl.

== G ==
- Pittosporum gagnepainianum Gowda
- Pittosporum gagnepainii Doweld
- Pittosporum gatopense Guillaumin
- Pittosporum gayanum Rock
- Pittosporum glaberrimum Merr.
- Pittosporum glabratum Lindl.
- Pittosporum glabrum Hook. & Arn.
- Pittosporum goetzei Engl.
- Pittosporum gracile Pancher ex Brongn. & Gris

== H ==
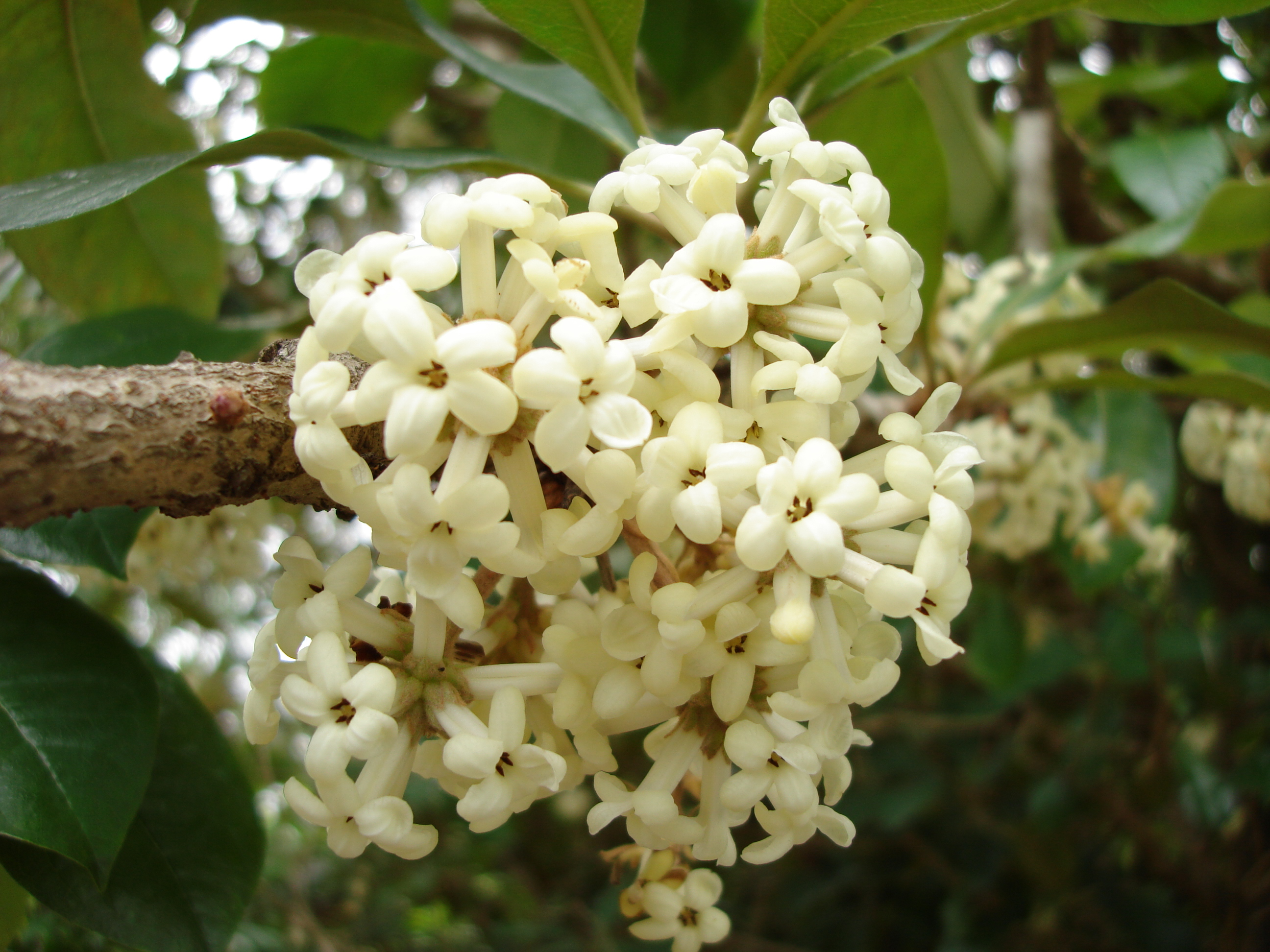
Pittosporum hosmeri

- Pittosporum halophilum Rock
- Pittosporum hawaiiense Hillebr.
- Pittosporum heckelii Dubard
- Pittosporum hematomallum Guillaumin
- Pittosporum henryi Gowda
- Pittosporum heterophyllum Franch.
- Pittosporum hosmeri Rock
- Pittosporum humbertii Cufod.
- Pittosporum humile Hook.f. & Thomson
- Pittosporum huttonianum Kirk

== I ==
- Pittosporum illicioides Makino
- Pittosporum impressum (Ridl.) L.W.Cayzer & Utteridge
- Pittosporum inopinatum K.Bakker
- Pittosporum × intermedium Kirk
- Pittosporum isolatum L.W.Cayzer & Utteridge

== J ==
- Pittosporum javanicum (Blume) Blume
- Pittosporum johnstonianum Gowda

== K ==
- Pittosporum kaalense Guillaumin
- Pittosporum karnatakense Saldanha & S.R.Ramesh
- Pittosporum kauaiense Hillebr.
- Pittosporum kerrii Craib
- Pittosporum kirkii Hook.f. ex Kirk
- Pittosporum koghiense Guillaumin
- Pittosporum kororoense Benwell
- Pittosporum kunmingense H.T.Chang & S.Z.Yan
- Pittosporum kwangsiense H.T.Chang & S.Z.Yan
- Pittosporum kweichowense Gowda

== L ==
- Pittosporum lacrymasepalum Utteridge
- Pittosporum lancifolium (F.M.Bailey) L.W.Cayzer, Crisp & I.Telford
- Pittosporum lanipetalum Tirel & Veillon
- Pittosporum ledermannii E.Pritz.
- Pittosporum lenticellatum Chun ex H.Peng & Y.F.Deng
- Pittosporum leptosepalum Gowda
- Pittosporum leratii Guillaumin
- Pittosporum leroyanum Tirel & Veillon
- Pittosporum letocartiorum Veillon & Tirel
- Pittosporum ligustrifolium A.Cunn.
- Pittosporum lineare Laing & Gourlay
- Pittosporum linearifolium Sugau
- Pittosporum longisepalum K.Bakker
- Pittosporum loniceroides Brongn. & Gris
- Pittosporum luteum H.St.John

== M ==
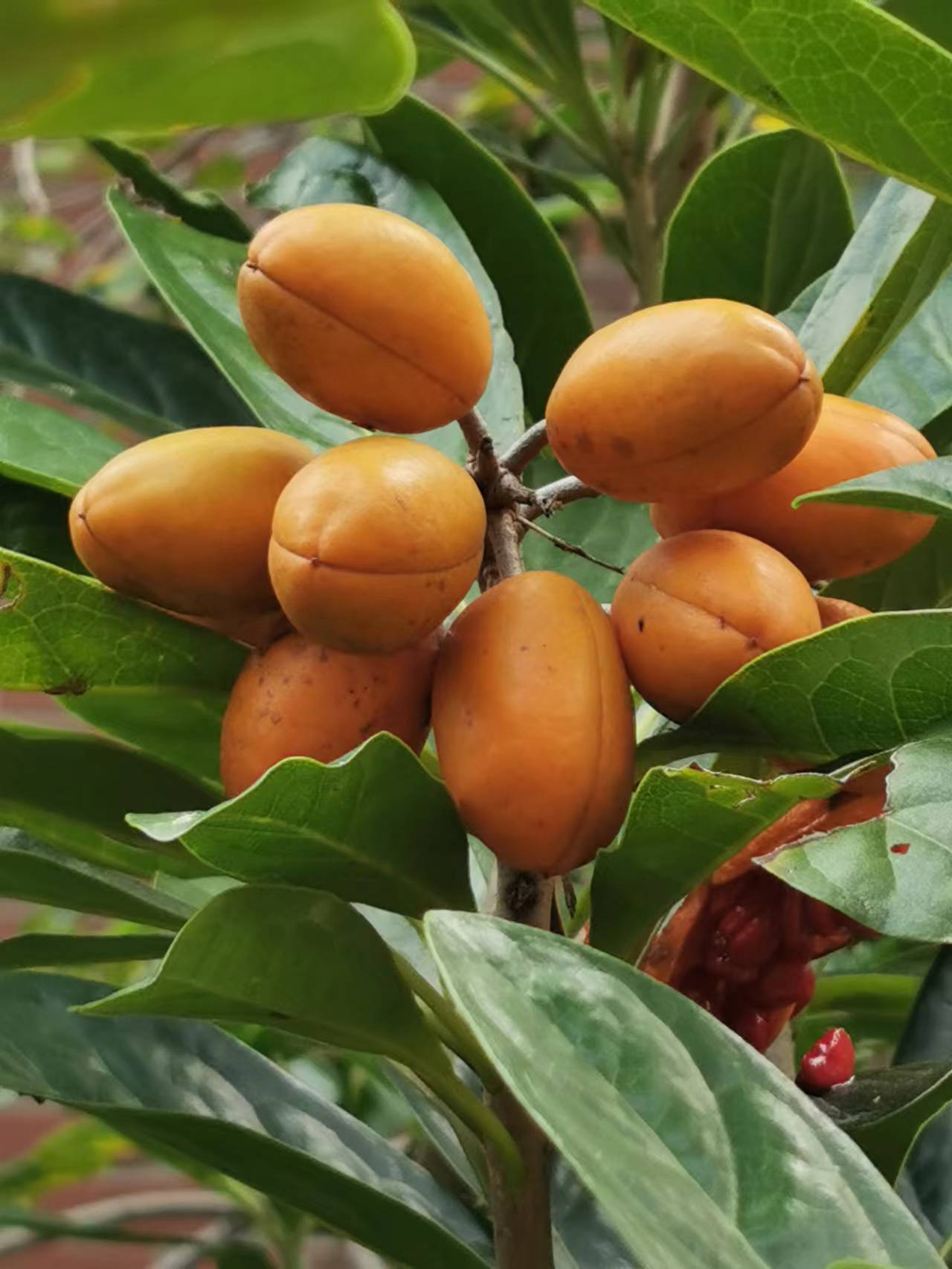
Pittosporum moluccanum

- Pittosporum mackeei Tirel & Veillon
- Pittosporum macrosepalum Cufod.
- Pittosporum maireaui H.St.John
- Pittosporum malaxanii Veillon & Tirel
- Pittosporum maoshanense Z.H.Chen, G.Y.Li & X.F.Jin
- Pittosporum maxwellii Utteridge
- Pittosporum megacarpum Merr.
- Pittosporum merrillianum Gowda
- Pittosporum michiei Allan
- Pittosporum mildbraedii Engl.
- Pittosporum moluccanum (Lam.) Miq.
- Pittosporum × monae Rock ex H.St.John
- Pittosporum monticola Miq.
- Pittosporum morierei Vieill. ex Guillaumin
- Pittosporum multiflorum (A.Cunn. ex Benth.) L.W.Cayzer, Crisp & I.Telford
- Pittosporum muricatum Tirel & Veillon

== N ==
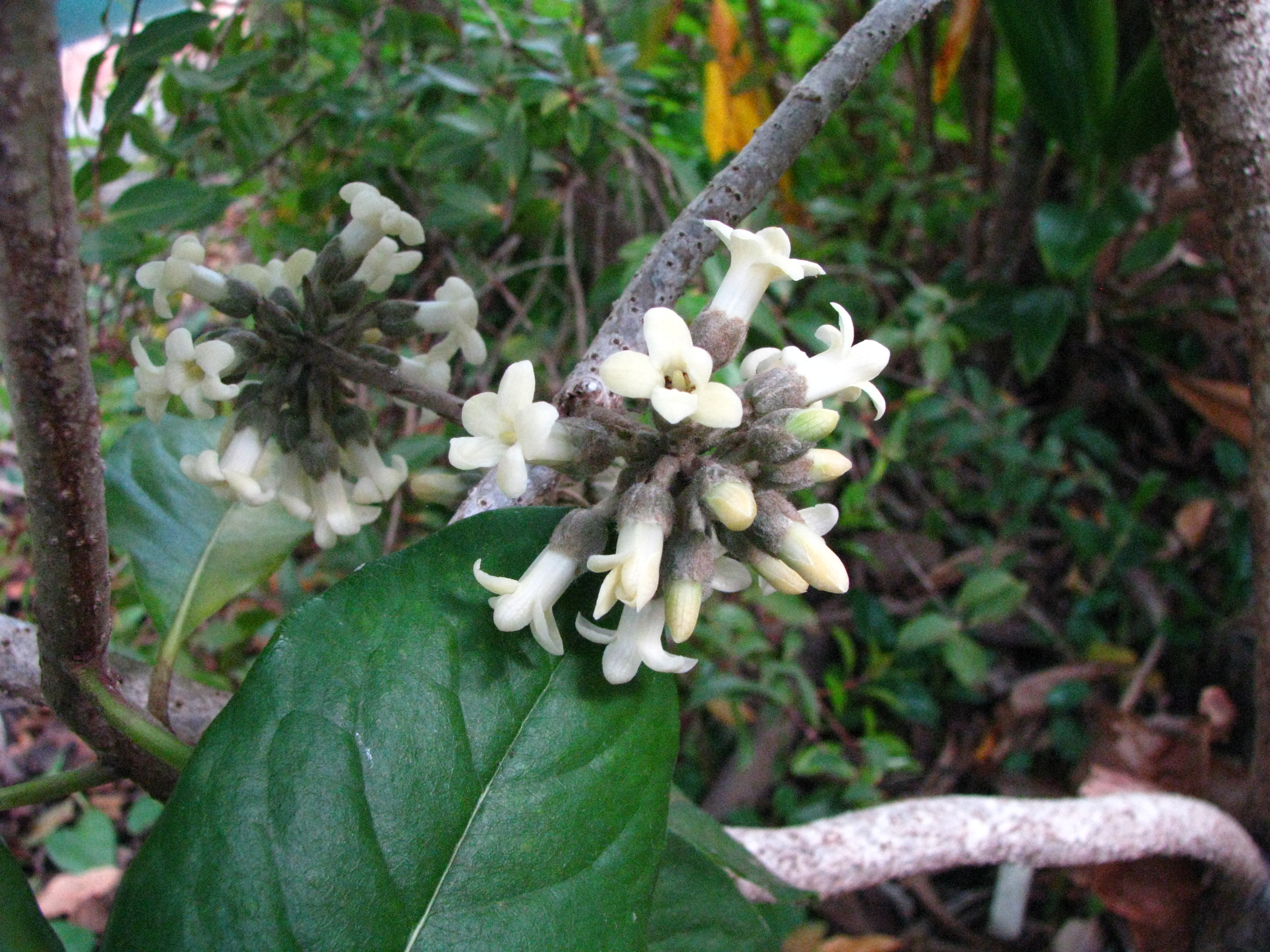
Pittosporum napaliense

- Pittosporum napaliense Sherff
- Pittosporum napaulense (DC.) Rehder & E.H.Wilson
- Pittosporum nativitatis Baker f.
- Pittosporum neelgherrense Wight & Arn.
- Pittosporum nubicola Schodde
- Pittosporum nubigenum Ridl.

== O ==
- Pittosporum × obcordatum Raoul
- Pittosporum oblongilimbum Merr.
- Pittosporum obovatum Guillaumin
- Pittosporum obscurinerve Merr.
- Pittosporum ochrosiifolium Bojer
- Pittosporum odoratum Merr.
- Pittosporum oligodontum Gillespie
- Pittosporum oligophlebium H.T.Chang & S.Z.Yan
- Pittosporum omeiense H.T.Chang & S.Z.Yan
- Pittosporum oreillyanum C.T.White
- Pittosporum oreophilum Guillaumin
- Pittosporum ornatum Tirel & Veillon
- Pittosporum orohenense J.W.Moore
- Pittosporum oubatchense Schltr.
- Pittosporum owenstanleyense L.W.Cayzer & Utteridge

== P ==
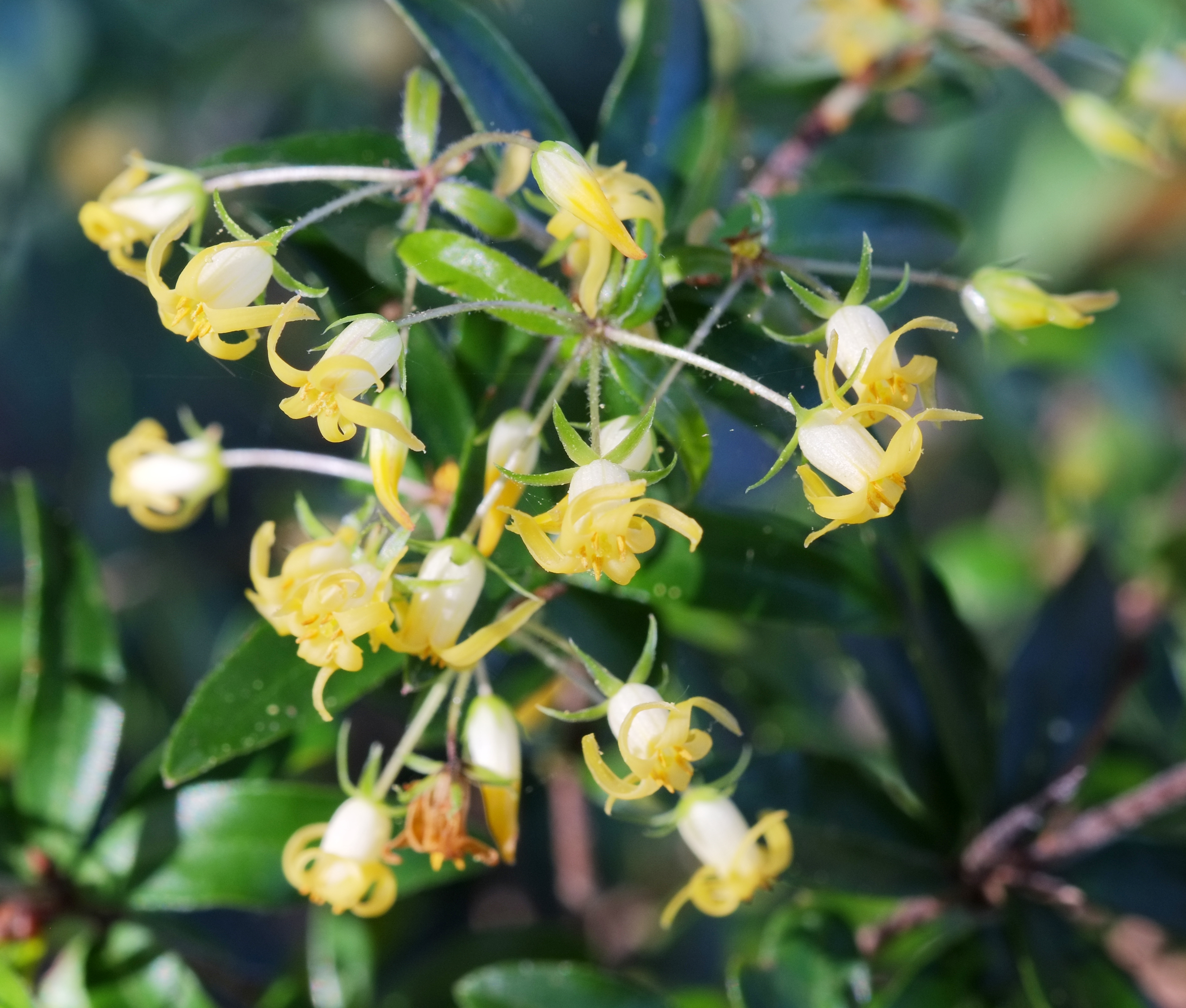
Pittosporum pimeleoides

- Pittosporum pachyphyllum Baker
- Pittosporum pancheri Brongn. & Gris
- Pittosporum pangalanense Cufod.
- Pittosporum paniculatum Brongn. & Gris
- Pittosporum paniculiferum H.T.Chang & S.Z.Yan
- Pittosporum paniense Guillaumin
- Pittosporum parvicapsulare H.T.Chang & S.Z.Yan
- Pittosporum parvifolium Hayata
- Pittosporum parvilimbum H.T.Chang & S.Z.Yan
- Pittosporum patelliplacenta (Schodde) L.W.Cayzer & Utteridge
- Pittosporum patulum Hook.f.
- Pittosporum pauciflorum Hook. & Arn.
- Pittosporum pentandrum (Blanco) Merr.
- Pittosporum perahuense H.St.John
- Pittosporum perglabratum H.T.Chang & S.Z.Yan
- Pittosporum peridoticola Sugau & Ent
- Pittosporum perryanum Gowda
- Pittosporum pervillei Blume
- Pittosporum phillyreoides DC.
- Pittosporum pickeringii A.Gray
- Pittosporum pimeleoides A.Cunn. ex Putt.
- Pittosporum planilobum H.T.Chang & S.Z.Yan
- Pittosporum podocarpum Gagnep.
- Pittosporum polyspermum Tul.
- Pittosporum poueboense Guillaumin
- Pittosporum poumense Guillaumin
- Pittosporum praedictum Schodde
- Pittosporum pronyense Guillaumin
- Pittosporum pseudostipitatum Merr.
- Pittosporum pulgarense Elmer
- Pittosporum pullifolium Burkill
- Pittosporum pumilum Schodde
- Pittosporum purpurascens (Schodde) L.W.Cayzer & Utteridge
- Pittosporum purpureum H.St.John

== Q ==
- Pittosporum qinlingense Y.Ren & X.Liu

== R ==
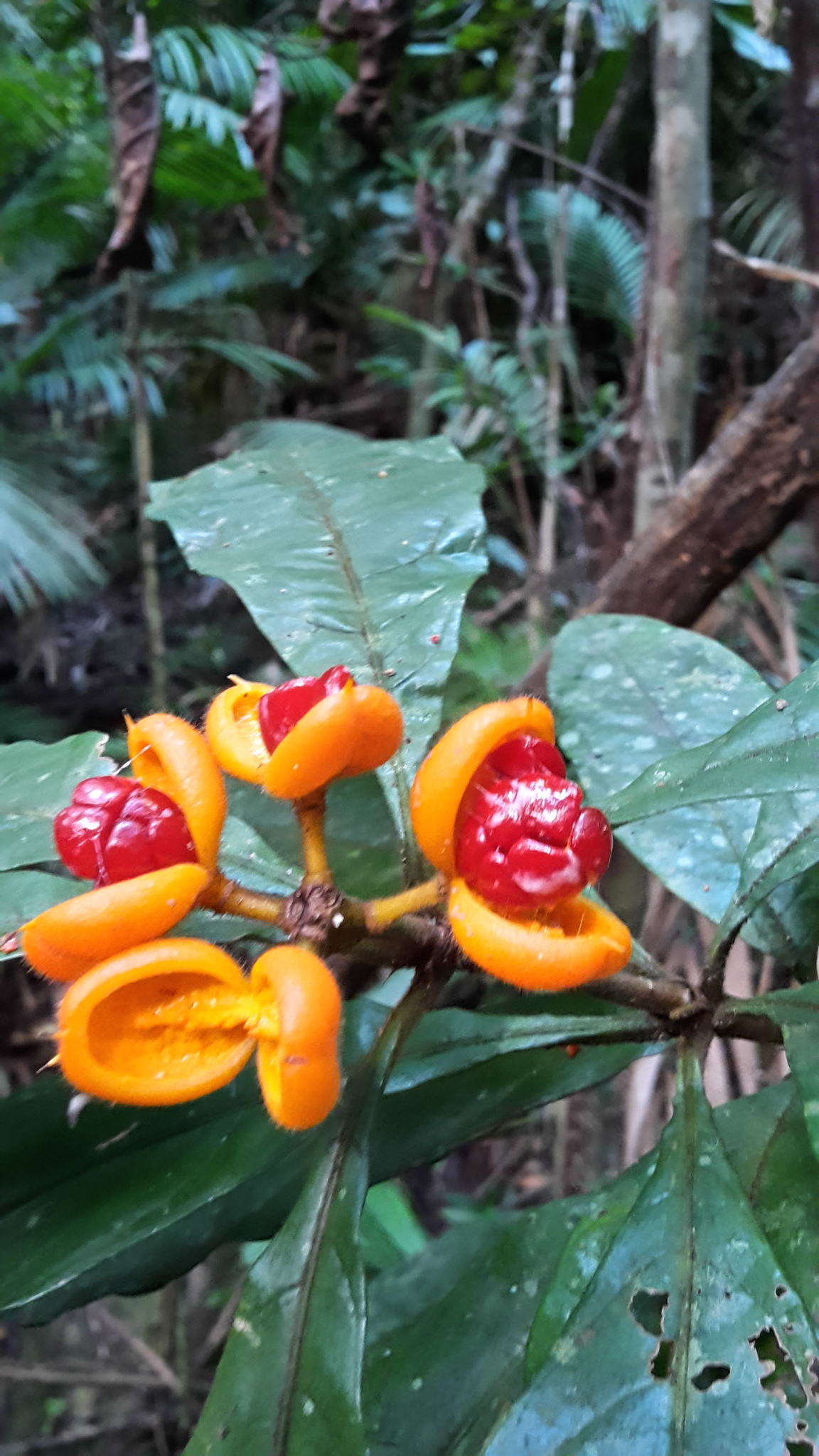
Pittosporum rubiginosum

- Pittosporum raivavaeense H.St.John
- Pittosporum ralphii Kirk
- Pittosporum ramiflorum (Zoll. & Moritzi) Zoll. ex Miq.
- Pittosporum ramosii Merr.
- Pittosporum rangitahua E.K.Cameron & Sykes
- Pittosporum rapense F.Br.
- Pittosporum rarotongense Hemsl.
- Pittosporum reflexisepalum C.Y.Wu
- Pittosporum rehderianum Gowda
- Pittosporum resiniferum Hemsl.
- Pittosporum reticosum Ridl.
- Pittosporum revolutum W.T.Aiton
- Pittosporum rhytidocarpum A.Gray
- Pittosporum ridleyi L.W.Cayzer & G.Chandler
- Pittosporum rigidum Hook.f.
- Pittosporum roimata Gemmill & S.N.Carter
- Pittosporum rubiginosum A.Cunn.

== S ==
- Pittosporum salicifolium Danguy
- Pittosporum samoense Christoph.
- Pittosporum saxicola Rehder & E.H.Wilson
- Pittosporum schoddei L.W.Cayzer & Utteridge
- Pittosporum scythophyllum Schltr.
- Pittosporum senacia Putt.
- Pittosporum serpentinum (de Lange) de Lange
- Pittosporum sessilifolium Tirel & Veillon
- Pittosporum silamense Sugau
- Pittosporum simsonii Montrouz.
- Pittosporum sinuatum Blume
- Pittosporum sogeriense L.W.Cayzer & Utteridge
- Pittosporum spinescens (F.Muell.) L.W.Cayzer, Crisp & I.Telford
- Pittosporum spissescens Utteridge
- Pittosporum stenopetalum Baker
- Pittosporum suatinum Schodde
- Pittosporum subulisepalum Hu & F.T.Wang
- Pittosporum sulawesiense L.W.Cayzer & G.Chandler
- Pittosporum sylvaticum Guillaumin

== T ==
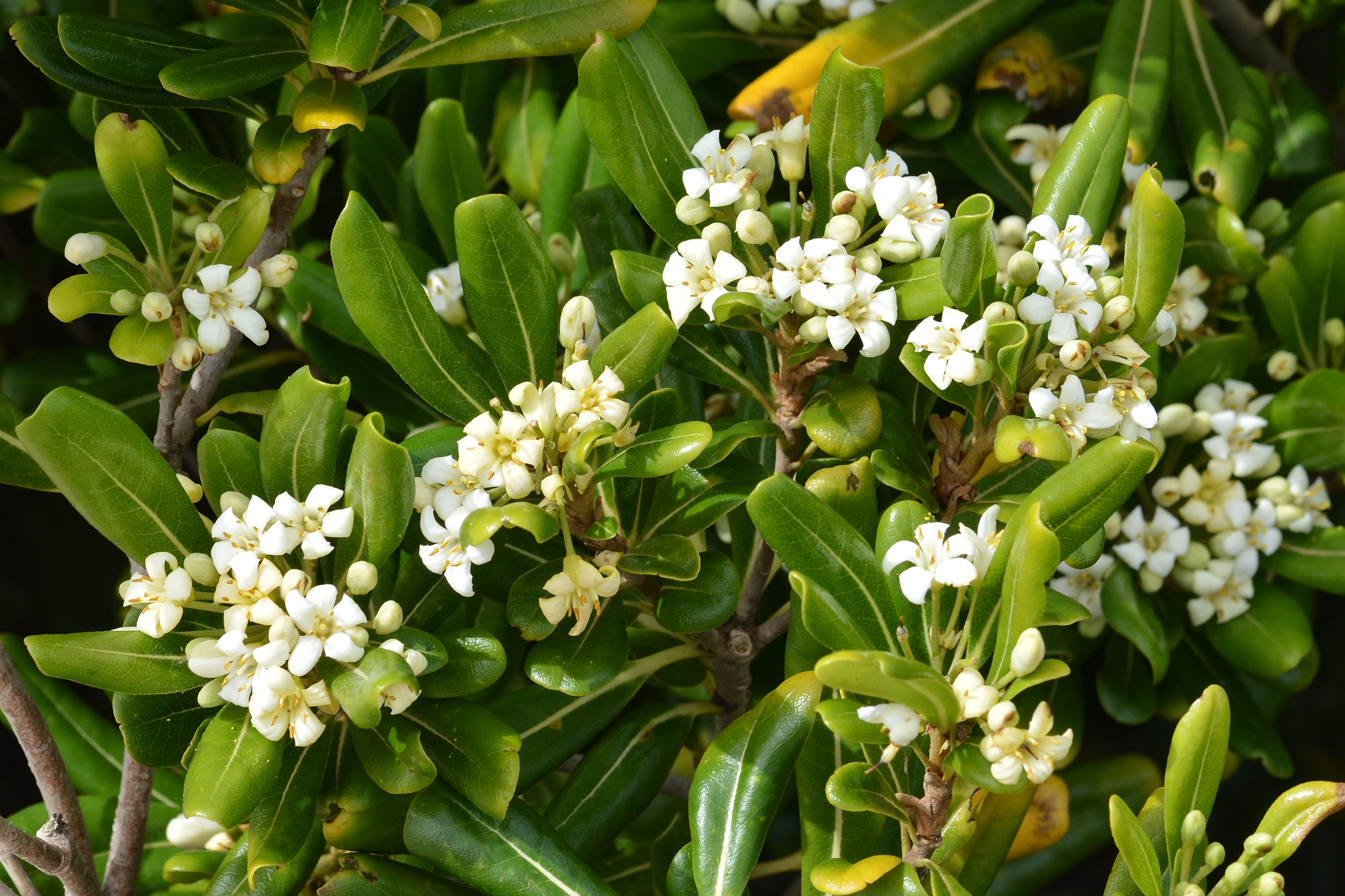
Pittosporum tobira

- Pittosporum taitense Putt.
- Pittosporum takauele H.St.John
- Pittosporum tanianum Veillon & Tirel
- Pittosporum tenuifolium Gaertn.
- Pittosporum tenuivalvatum H.T.Chang & S.Z.Yan
- Pittosporum terminalioides Planch. ex A.Gray
- Pittosporum tetraspermum Wight & Arn.
- Pittosporum timorense Blume
- Pittosporum tinifolium A.Cunn.
- Pittosporum tobira (Thunb.) W.T.Aiton
- Pittosporum tonkinense Gagnep.
- Pittosporum trigonocarpum H.Lév.
- Pittosporum trilobum L.W.Cayzer, Crisp & I.Telford
- Pittosporum truncatum E.Pritz.
- Pittosporum tubiflorum H.T.Chang & S.Z.Yan
- Pittosporum turneri Petrie

== U ==
- Pittosporum umbellatum Gaertn.
- Pittosporum undulatifolium H.T.Chang & S.Z.Yan
- Pittosporum undulatum Vent.

== V ==
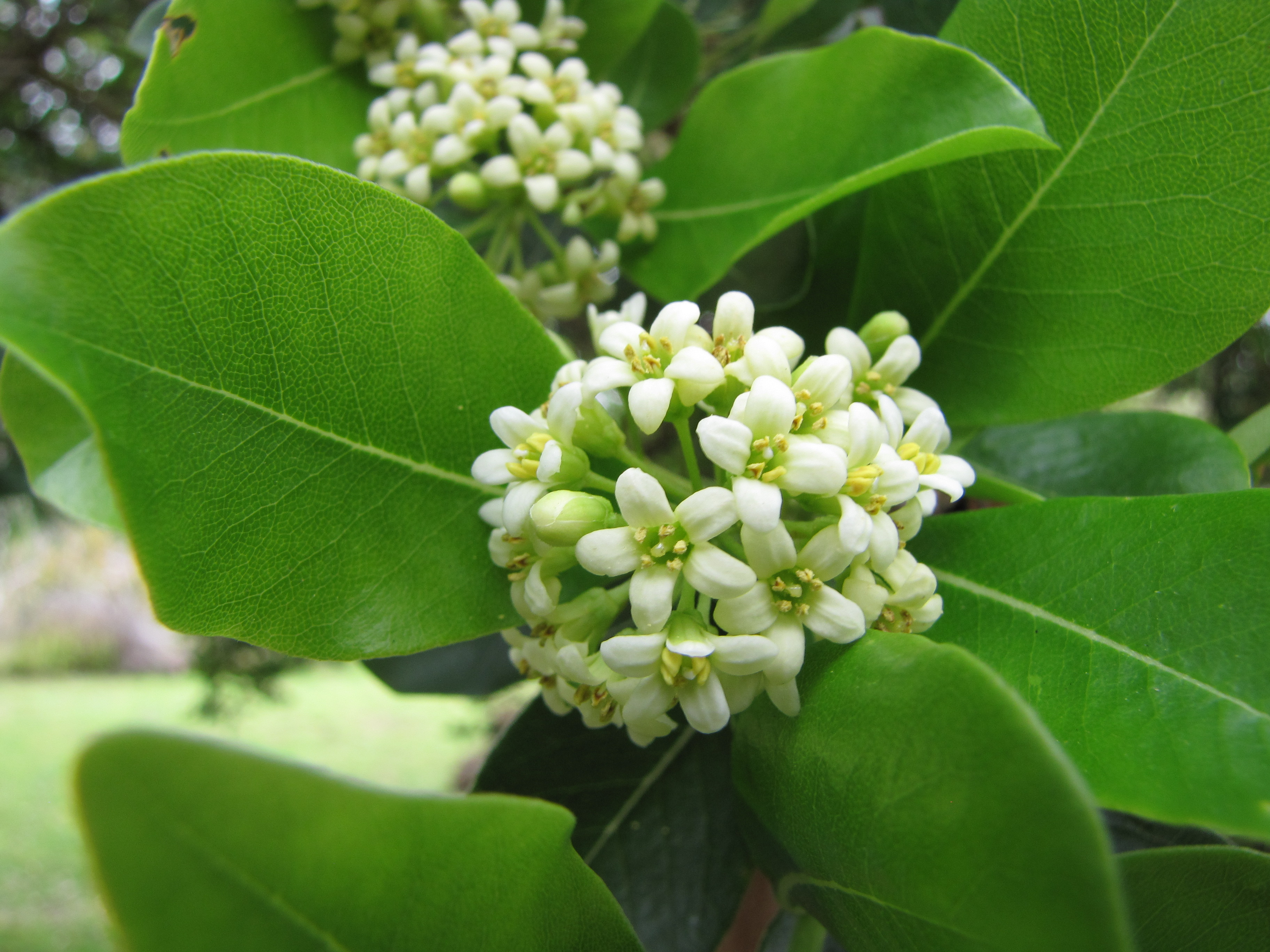
Pittosporum viridiflorum

- Pittosporum venulosum F.Muell.
- Pittosporum verrucosum Veillon & Tirel
- Pittosporum viburnifolium Hayata
- Pittosporum virgatum Kirk
- Pittosporum viridiflorum Sims
- Pittosporum viridulum M.P.Nayar, G.S.Giri & V.Chandras.
- Pittosporum viscidum L.W.Cayzer, Crisp & I.Telford

== W ==
- Pittosporum wingii F.Muell.

== X ==
- Pittosporum xanthanthum Schltr.
- Pittosporum xenicum Schodde
- Pittosporum xylocarpum Hu & F.T.Wang

== Y ==
- Pittosporum yunckeri A.C.Sm.
