= Weeping Pittosporum =

Weeping Pittosporum may refer to several Pittosporum species, including:

- Pittosporum phillyreoides, a Western Australian species
- Pittosporum angustifolium, an inland Australian species
