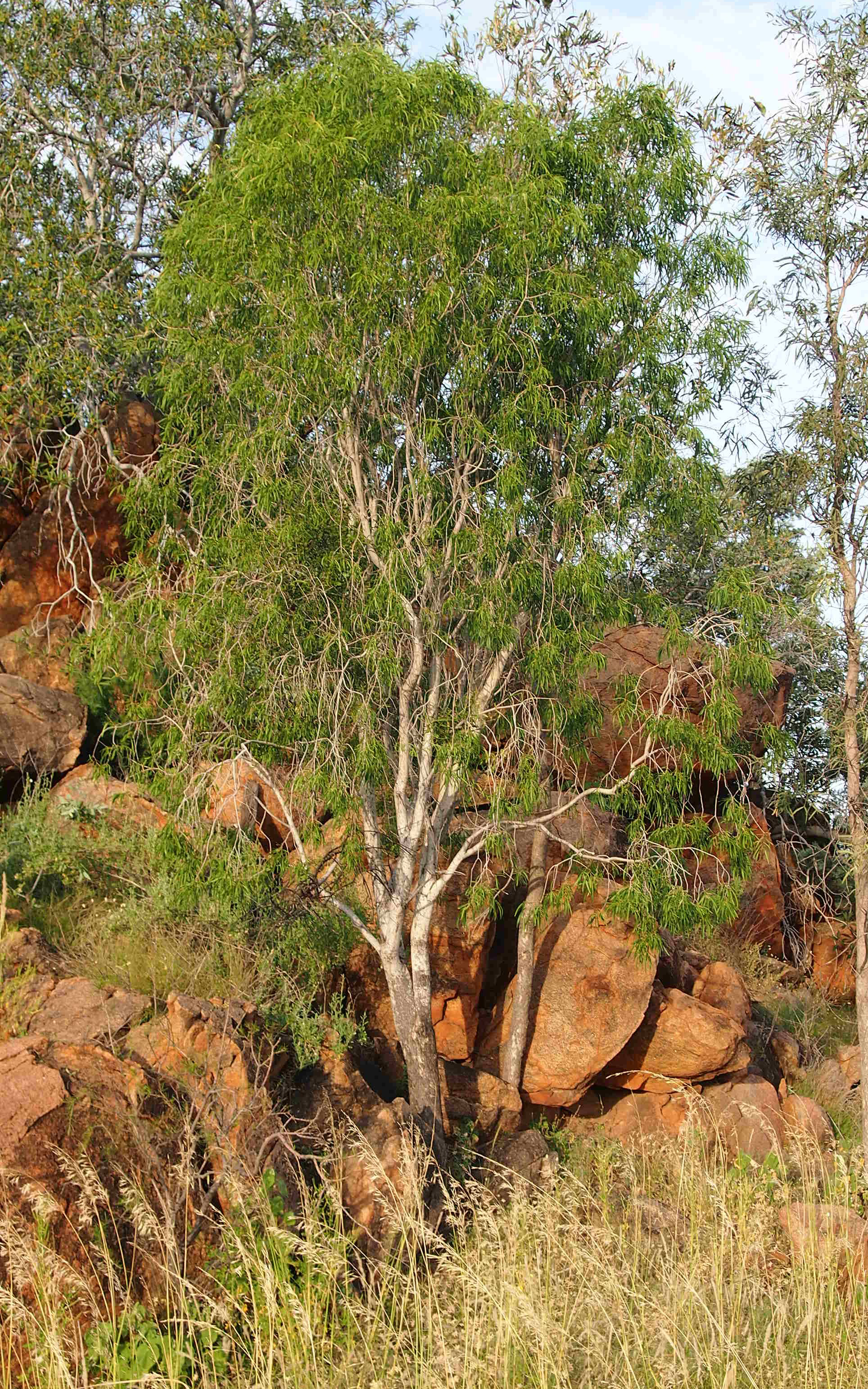

Conservation status
- Least Concern (IUCN 3.1)

Scientific classification
- Kingdom: Plantae
- Clade: Tracheophytes
- Clade: Angiosperms
- Clade: Eudicots
- Clade: Asterids
- Order: Apiales
- Family: Pittosporaceae
- Genus: Pittosporum
- Species: P. angustifolium

Binomial name
- Pittosporum angustifolium Lodd., G.Lodd. & W.Lodd.

Synonyms
- List: Pittosporum acacioides A.Cunn.; Pittosporum lanceolatum A.Cunn. nom. inval., nom. nud.; Pittosporum longifolium Putt.; Pittosporum phillyraeoides var. microcarpa S.Moore orth. var.; Pittosporum phillyreoides var. microcarpa S.Moore; Pittosporum phillyreoides var. microcarpa S.Moore isonym; Pittosporum phylliraeoides var. microcarpa E.M.Benn. orth. var.; Pittosporum roeanum Putt.; Pittosporum salicinum Lindl. p.p.; Pittosporum phillyreoides auct. non DC.: Stanley, T.D. in Stanley, T.D. & Ross, E.M. (1984), Pittosporaceae. Flora of South-eastern Queensland 1; Pittosporum phillyreoides auct. non DC.: Bennett, E.M. in Jessop, J.P. & Toelken, H.R. (ed.) (1986), Flora of South Australia; Pittosporum phillyreoides auct. non DC.: Wheeler, J.R. in Marchant, N.G., Wheeler, J.R., Rye, B.L., Bennett, E.M., Lander, N.S. & Macfarlane, T.D. (1987), Pittosporaceae.; Pittosporum phillyreoides auct. non DC.: Makinson, R.O. in Harden, G.J. (ed.) (1992), Pittosporaceae. Flora of New South Wales; Pittosporum phillyreoides auct. non DC.: Walsh, N.G. & Albrecht, D.E. in Walsh, N.G. & Entwisle, T.J. (ed.) (1996), Pittosporaceae.

= Pittosporum angustifolium =

Weeping pittosporum

Species of plant

Pittosporum angustifolium, commonly known as butterbush, weeping pittosporum, berrigan, native willow, native apricot, western pittosporum, apricot tree, bitter bush, cattle bush or poison berry tree, is a weeping shrub or tree that is endemic to mostly inland, continental Australia. It has oblong, linear or narrowly elliptic leaves, fragrant yellow to cream-coloured flowers arranged in leaf axils or on the ends of branches, and oval to spherical, yellowish capsules with dark or orange-red seeds.

== Description ==
Pittosporum angustifolium weeping shrub or tree up to about 10 m (33 ft) high. It has thick fissured, fibrous or flaky bark. Its leaves are arranged alternately, oblong, linear or narrowly elliptic, curved, 50–90 mm (2.0–3.5 in) long and 6–11 mm (0.24–0.43 in) wide on a petiole 5–14 mm (0.20–0.55 in) long. The flowers are dioecious, arranged singly or in small groups in leaf axils, or in clusters on the ends of branches, each flower on a pedicel 5–12 mm (0.20–0.47 in) long. Male flowers are in groups of four, with a small pistil and stamens 5.5–6.0 mm (0.22–0.24 in) long. Female flowers have an ovary about 5 mm (0.20 in) long with a short style. Flowering mostly occurs from winter to spring, and the fruit is an oval to spherical, yellowish capsule 8–14 mm (0.31–0.55 in) in diameter containing sticky, reddish-brown seeds 4–5 mm (0.16–0.20 in) long.

== Taxonomy ==
Pittosporum angustifolium was first described in 1832 in the Loddiges' The Botanical Cabinet, published by William and George Loddiges.

George Bentham combined this species and P. ligustrifolium with P. phillyreoides; however, all three were split in the 2000 revision; the true P. phillyreoides is only found in a narrow coastal strip of northwestern Australia. The weeping foliage of P. angustifolium distinguishes it from the other two taxa.

Phylogenetic relationships of related species

- - - - - - - - P. taitense
              - P. arborescens
            - P. moluccanum
          - - P. lancifolium
            - P. spinescens
        - P. angustifolium
      - - P. resiniferum
        - P. ramiflorum
    - P. tenuifolium
  - all other Pittosporum species

Cladogram of 9 most closely related species according to the Open Tree of Life.

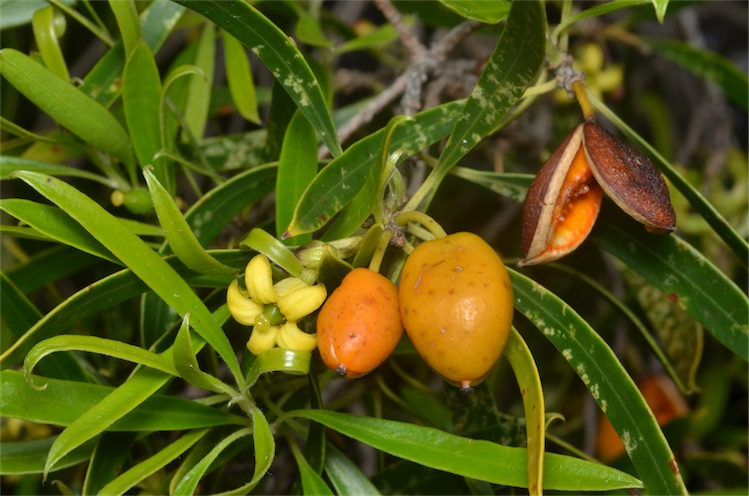
Flower and fruit in Port Lincoln

== Distribution and habitat ==
Pittosporum angustifolium is a widespread plant found in all states of Australia apart from Tasmania and in the Northern Territory, mostly in inland Australia. It is found in mallee communities, on alluvial flats and ridges, as well as in dry woodland and on loamy, clay or sandy soils, however it is never common.

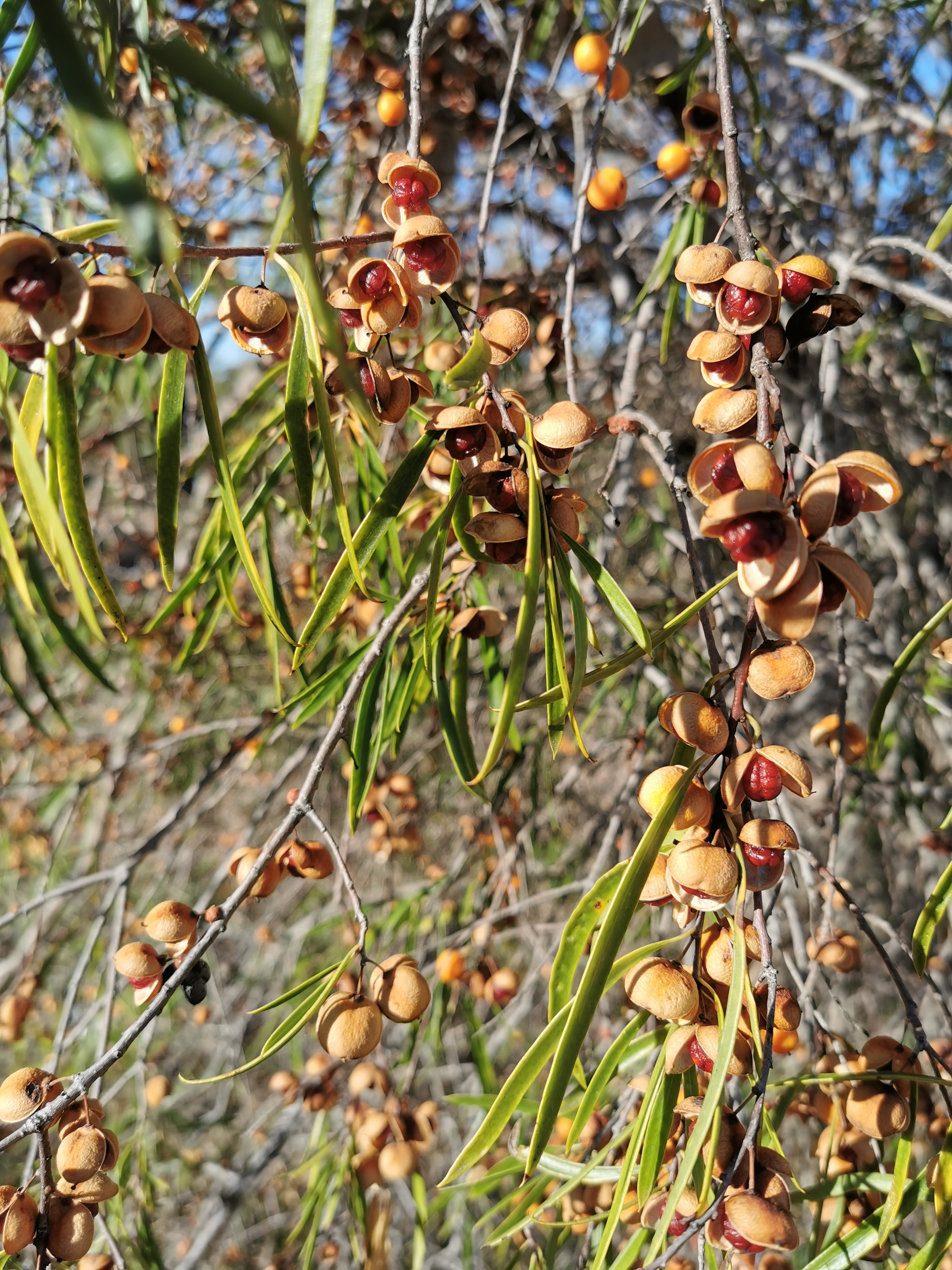
Fruit

It is drought- and frost-resistant. It can survive in areas with rainfall as low as 150 mm (5.9 in) per year. A resilient desert species, individuals may live for over a hundred years.

== Uses ==
Pittosporum angustifolium is used as an ornamental plant in the garden, prized for its weeping habit and orange fruit.

=== Traditional/cultural use ===
Indigenous Australians used parts of the plant in various ways as medicine.

Uses varied from place to place and people to people. Some ate or chewed the gum that oozed from branches, while others ground seeds into flour for food. Most commonly, the leaves, seed or wood were steeped in hot water and made into a poultice or a tea for medicinal uses, such as to relieve digestive issues, internal pain and cramping, combat chronic fatigue, induce lactation, treat colds, muscle sprains, eczema and other sources of itching.

Despite being known as "native apricot", the bitter fruit is rarely considered a food source.

=== Medical/therapeutic use ===
Ongoing scientific research is being carried out internationally, and has begun to identify medically relevant biochemistry present in P. angustifolium, including anti microbial and antibacterial, antioxidant, antifungal, anti inflammatory, and galactogogue compounds. The findings suggest biochemical compounds from this plant have low toxicity when consumed by humans, and could be used to inhibit microbial and fungal growth, bring on lactation, induce apoptosis in cancer cells, protect cells against free radicals and oxidisation, and increase efficacy of commonly prescribed antibiotics; findings are consistent with traditional knowledge and uses.

Central Queensland University conducted a long-term project to examine the potential medicinal uses of native Australian plants, in consultation with Ghungalu elder Uncle Steve Kemp, who has been providing plant materials, including P. angustifolium, for the project. Cytotoxic, antioxidant and phenolic compounds have been identified, providing a strong case for the therapeutic benefits and potential cancer fighting properties of the plant. Some cytotoxic properties have also been identified in other studies.
