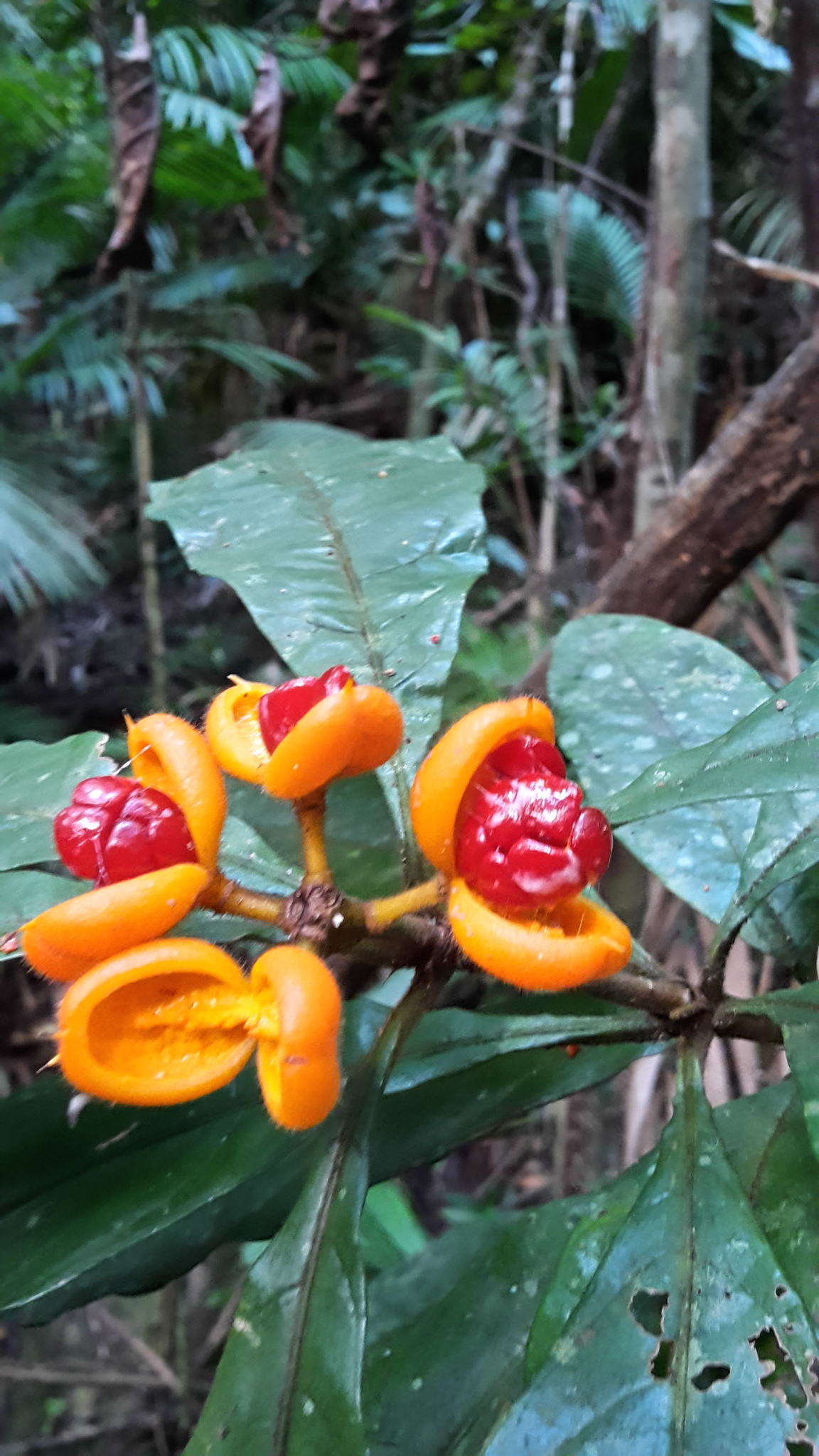
- Fruit

Conservation status
- Least Concern (NCA)

Scientific classification
- Kingdom: Plantae
- Clade: Tracheophytes
- Clade: Angiosperms
- Clade: Eudicots
- Clade: Asterids
- Order: Apiales
- Family: Pittosporaceae
- Genus: Pittosporum
- Species: P. rubiginosum

Binomial name
- Pittosporum rubiginosum A.Cunn.

Synonyms
- Pittosporum callicarpeum Domin

= Pittosporum rubiginosum =

Hairy red pittosporum

Species of flowering plant

Pittosporum rubiginosum, commonly known as hairy red pittosporum, is an evergreen shrub in the family Pittosporaceae which is endemic to northeastern Queensland, Australia. It was first described in 1840.

== Description ==
The hairy red pittosporum is a spindly shrub with a variable appearance as it matures. It usually grows up to about 3 m (9.8 ft) in height, however it may (rarely) reach 6 m (20 ft). The leaves are dark green above and usually purple underneath. Both sides of the leaves are glabrescent, meaning that they are initially hairy but become hairless with age. The size and shape of the leaves differ markedly from the juvenile stage to maturity − seedling leaves are densely hairy, those on a juvenile plant measure around 2.5 by 1.3 cm (1.0 by 0.5 in) while those of mature plants are about 24 by 8 cm (9.4 by 3.1 in). All stages have very short petioles and are mucronate, that is, they have a fine sharp point at the tip of the leaf.

This species exhibits varying forms at different altitudes - in upland forest it is more likely to have the juvenile appearance, while in the lowlands it will tend to show the mature forms.

The inflorescence may consist of a single flower or an umbel with numerous flowers. They are produced either terminally or in the leaf axils and measure up to 9.5 cm (3.7 in) long. The white flowers are held on densely hairy pedicels about 20 mm (0.8 in) long — the sepals are up to 9 mm (0.4 in) long, petals about 16 mm (0.6 in) long.

The fruit is an ellipsoid (i.e. like a rugby ball) orange-yellow capsule about 23 mm (0.9 in) long and 15 mm (0.6 in) wide. At maturity it splits open on a longitudinal line, revealing a cluster of bright red sticky seeds packed closely together.

== Taxonomy ==
This species was first described in 1840 by the English botanist Allan Cunningham, in a footnote in his paper dealing with the flora of New Zealand. The species Pittosporum callicarpeum, published in 1925 by the Czech botanist Karel Domin, is now considered a synonym of this species.

=== Etymology ===
The genus name Pittosporum comes from the Ancient Greek words πίττα (pítta) meaning "resin", and σπορά (sporā́), meaning "seed", and is a reference to the sticky seeds. The species epithet rubiginosum is derived from the Latin robiginosus, meaning "rusty red", which may be a reference to the colour of the seeds, or to the colour of the hairs on new growth.

== Distribution and habitat ==
The natural range of Pittosporum rubiginosum is from Cape York Peninsula to Tully, and from sea level to about 1,500 m (4,900 ft) altitude. It is an understorey shrub in lowland and upland rainforest.

== Ecology ==
The fruit of the hairy red Pittosporum are eaten by cassowaries (Casuarius casuarius), giant white-tailed rats (Uromys caudimaculatus), and other native rodents.

== Conservation ==
This species is listed by the Queensland Department of Environment and Science as least concern. As of 14 April 2023, it has not been assessed by the International Union for Conservation of Nature (IUCN).

== Gallery ==
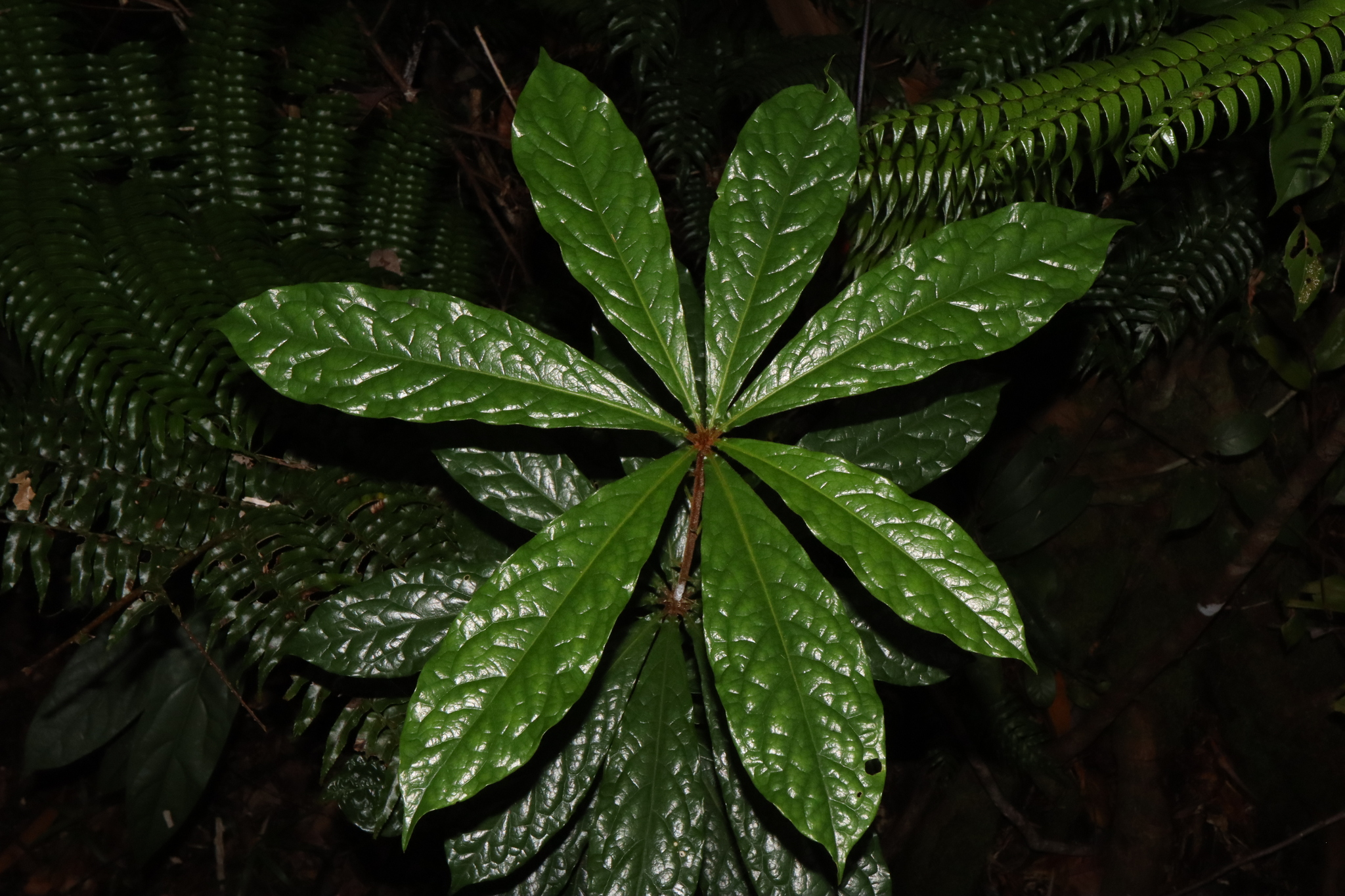
Foliage

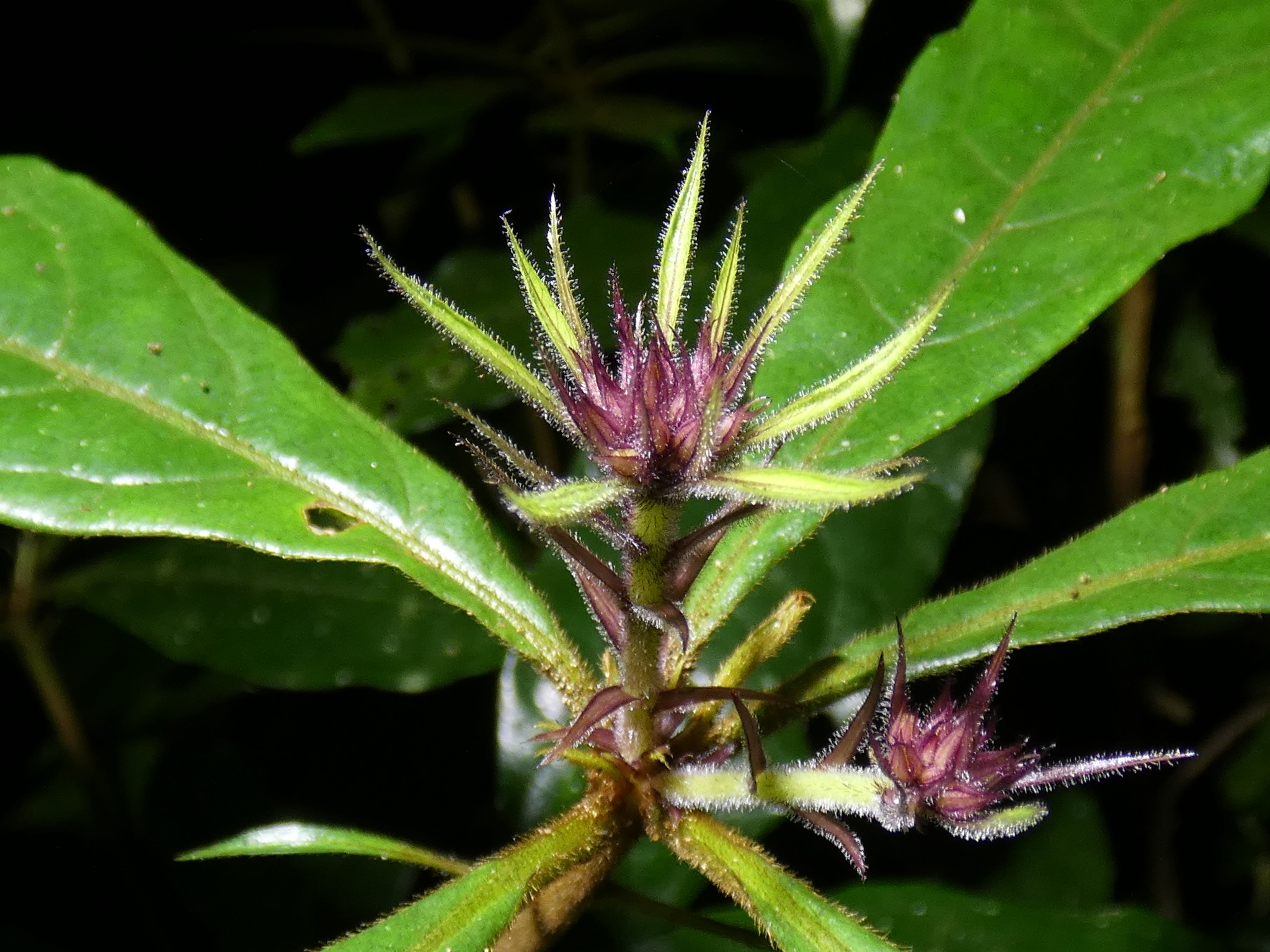
New growth

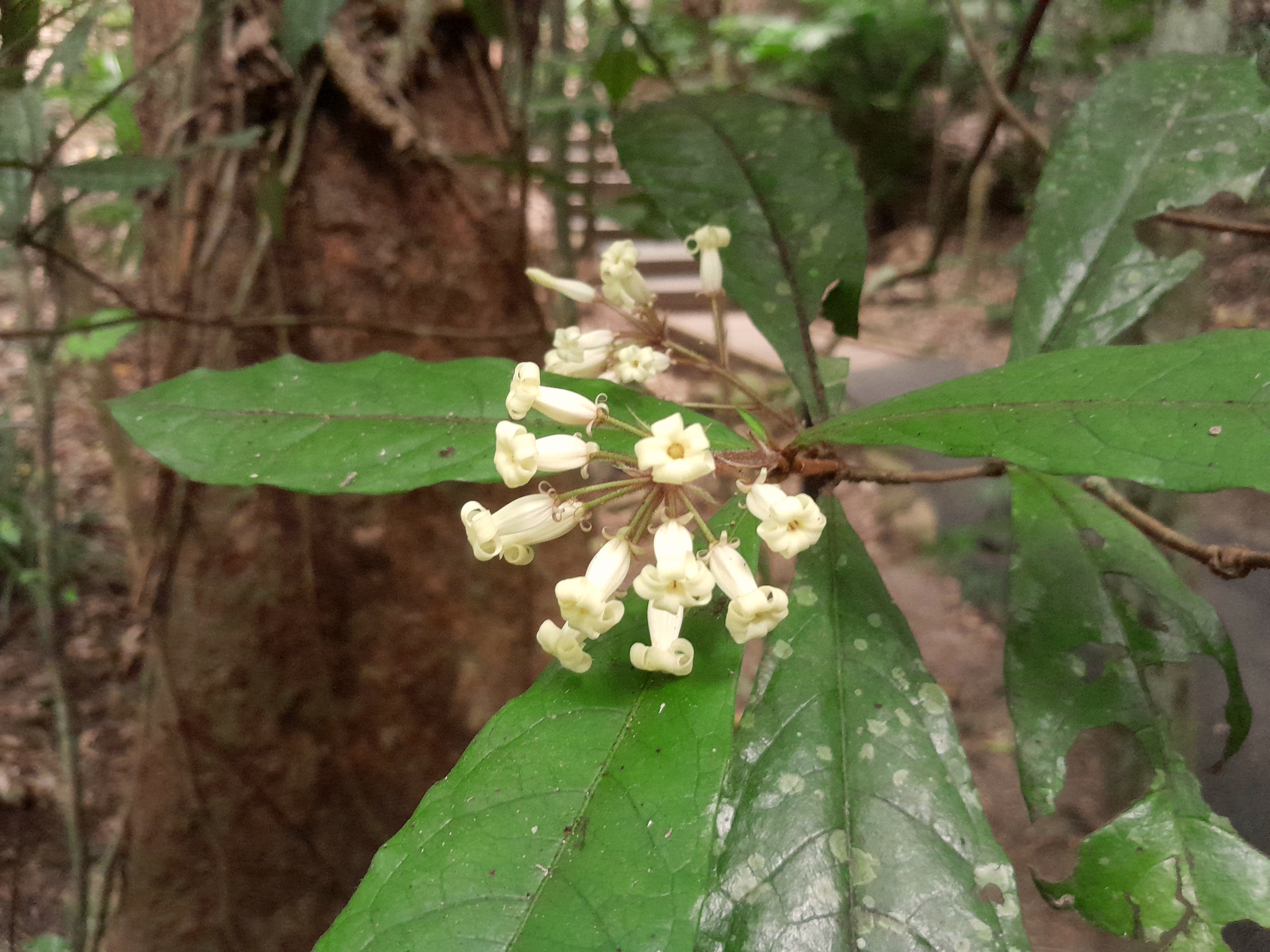
Inflorescence

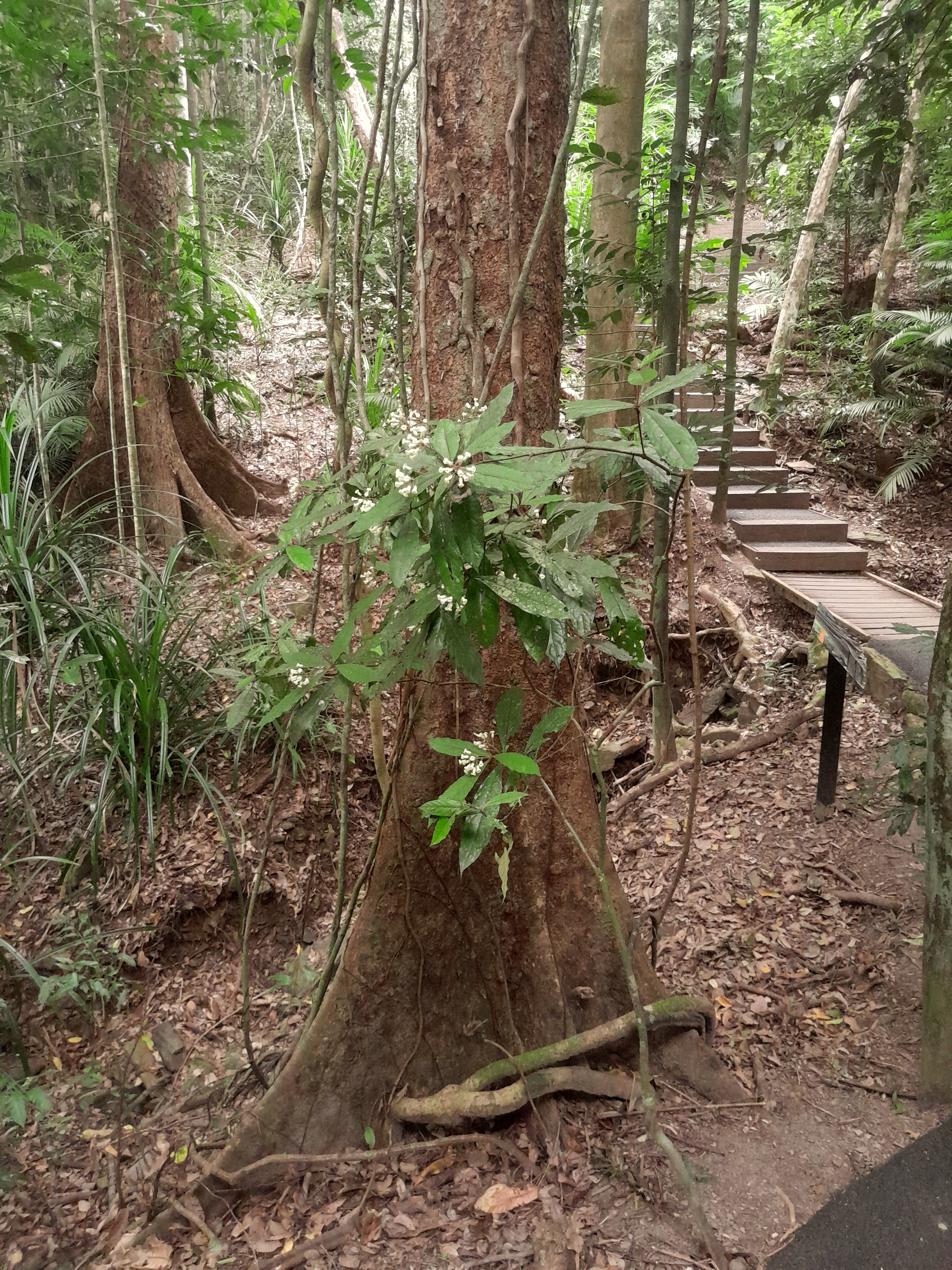
Habit

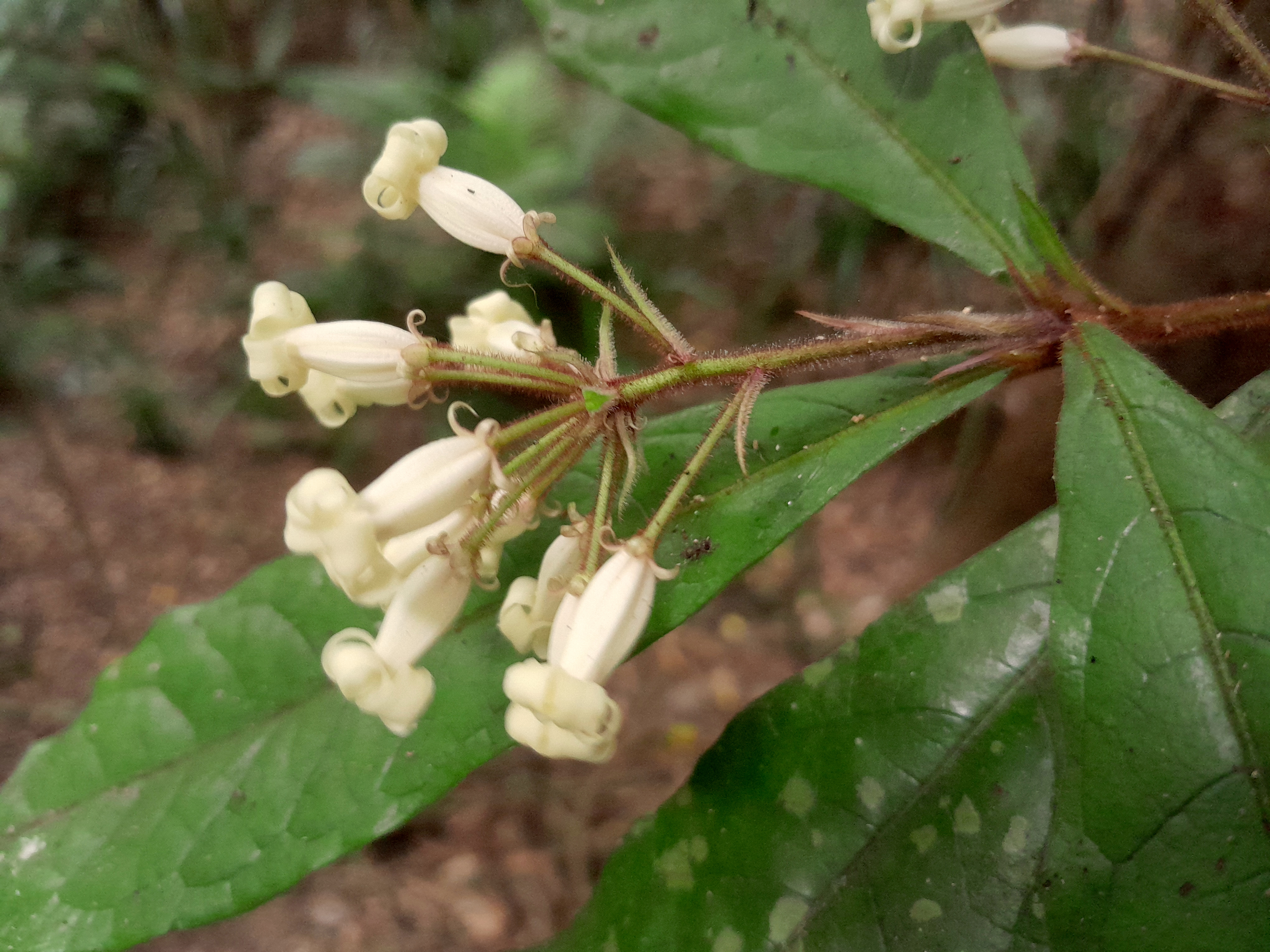
Hairy peduncle

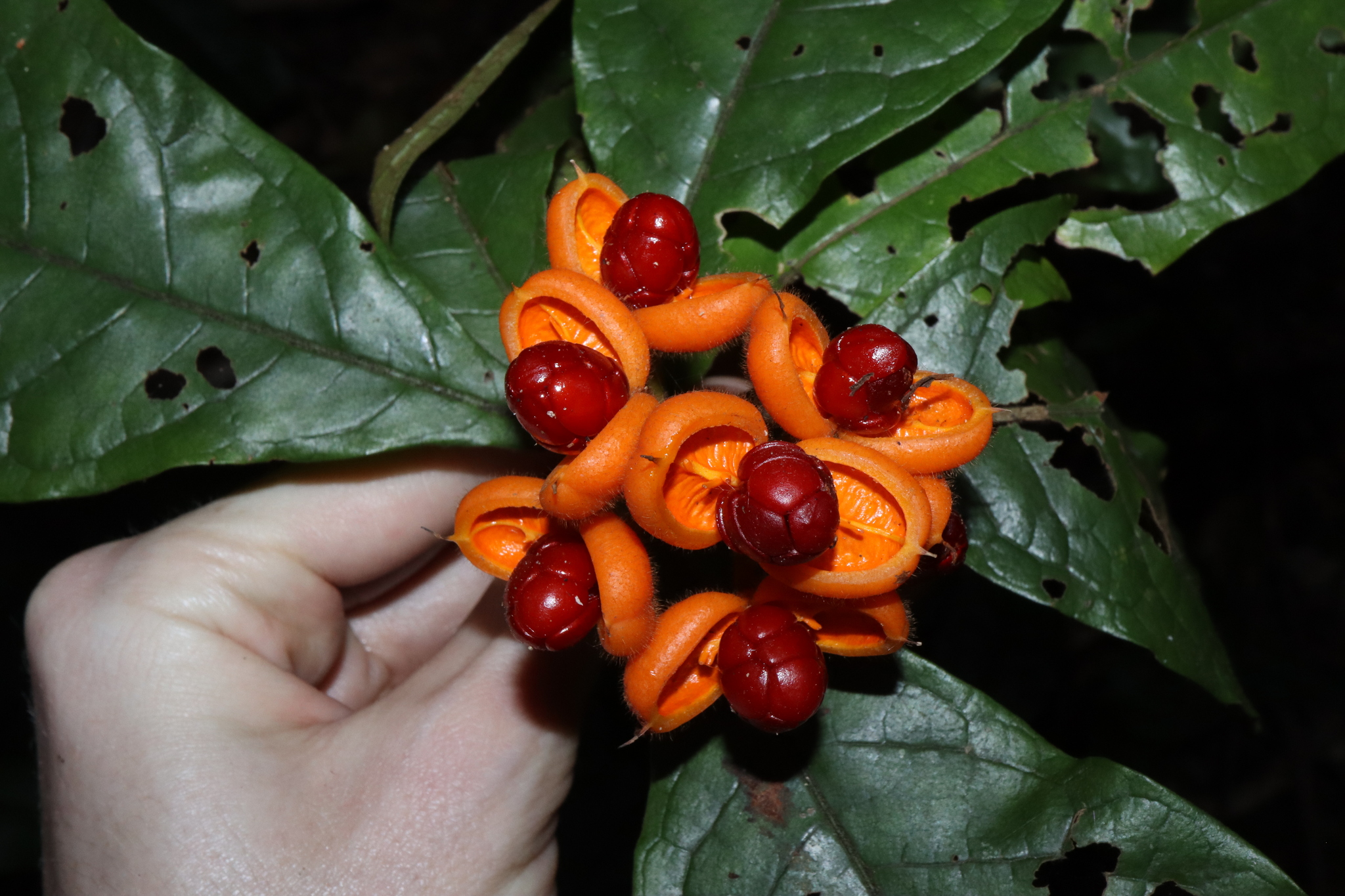
Dehiscing fruit
