= Pittosporum longisepalum =

Scientific classification
- Kingdom: Plantae
- Clade: Tracheophytes
- Clade: Angiosperms
- Clade: Eudicots
- Clade: Asterids
- Order: Apiales
- Family: Pittosporaceae
- Genus: Pittosporum
- Species: P. longisepalum

Binomial name
- Pittosporum longisepalum K.Bakker

Species of tree

Pittosporum longisepalum is a tree in the family Pittosporaceae. The specific epithet longisepalum means 'long sepal'.

== Description ==
Pittosporum longisepalum grows up to 10 m (33 ft) tall. The leaves are elliptic and measure up to 6 cm (2.4 in) long. The inflorescences are in cymes.

== Distribution and habitat ==
Pittosporum longisepalum is native to Sulawesi and Borneo, where it is confined to Sabah. Its habitat is in submontane forests at elevations of 1,200–1,500 m (4,000–5,000 ft).
