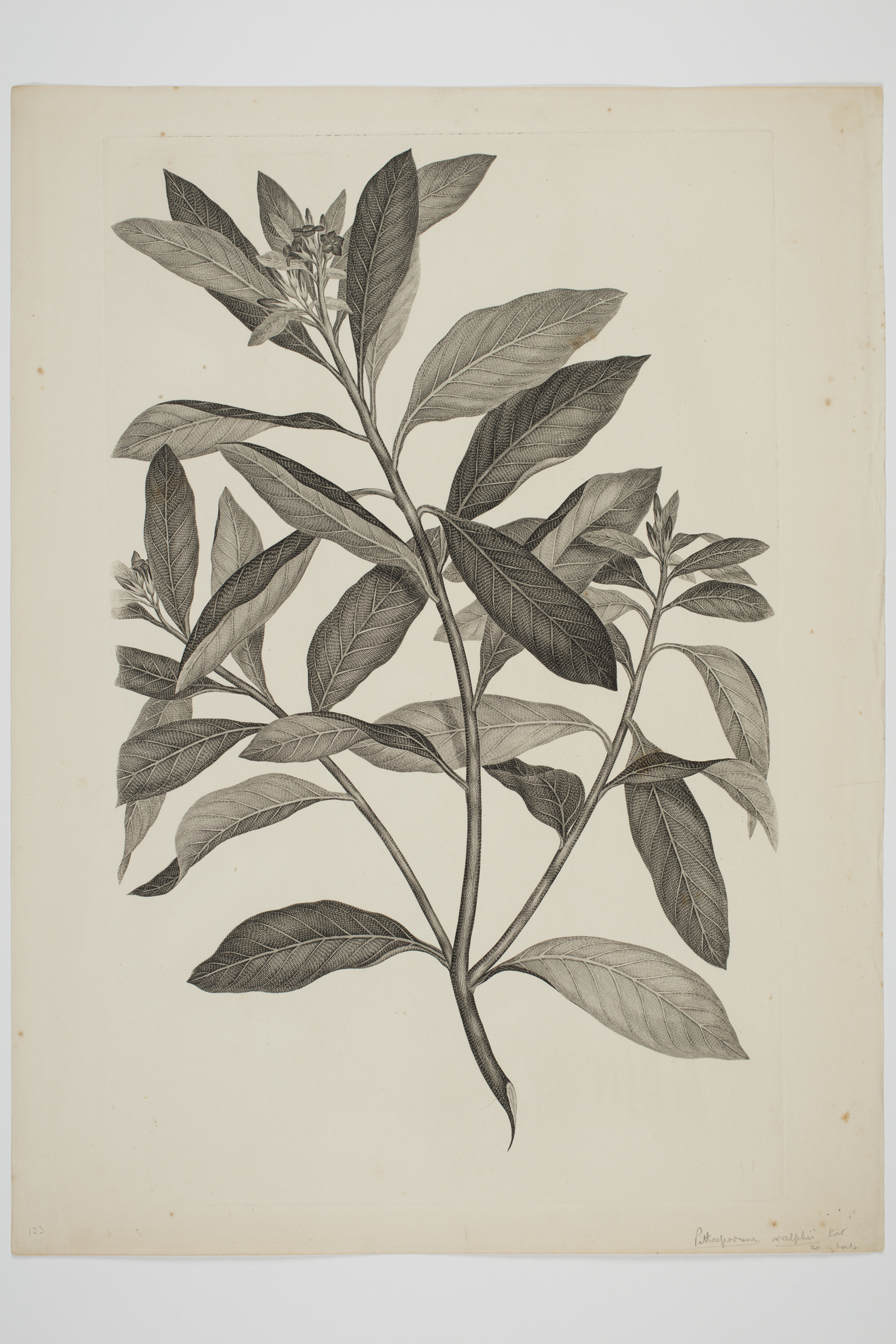

Scientific classification
- Kingdom: Plantae
- Clade: Embryophytes
- Clade: Tracheophytes
- Clade: Spermatophytes
- Clade: Angiosperms
- Clade: Eudicots
- Clade: Asterids
- Order: Apiales
- Family: Pittosporaceae
- Genus: Pittosporum
- Species: P. ralphii

Binomial name
- Pittosporum ralphii Kirk

= Pittosporum ralphii =

Species of plant

Pittosporum ralphii, also known as karo, soft karo, or Ralph's desertwillow is a small tree up to 6 m (20 ft) tall. Pittosporum ralphii is native to New Zealand.

== Description ==
Pittosporum ralphii has spreading branches and a trunk that is up to 15 cm (5.9 in) in diameter. It has hairy twigs, flowers, capsules, and leaf undersides so it is often considered to be related to P. crassifolium. It has dark brown bark.

The leaves of the Pittosporum ralphii are alternate on the branchlets. They are 5–12 cm (2.0–4.7 in) long and 2.5–5.5 cm (0.98–2.17 in) wide. The upper surface of the leaf is dark green with a dull glossy surface; the underside is covered in a white to greyish-white mat of fine hairs.

The leaf blade has a smooth, slightly wavy margin which tends to be recurved. The leaves narrow to a stout leaf stalk up to 2.5 cm (0.98 in) long. The leaf blade is stiff and leathery with the main veins evident.

Pittosporum ralphii has umbels. Umbels are a type of inflorescence i.e. a group or cluster of flowers arranged on a stem. Pittosporum ralphii inflorescences are umbels of 3-10 flowers, borne at the end of branchlets. The flowers are 1 cm wide and the petals are a dark red to almost black. The flowers emit a delicate scent, particularly in the evenings, presumably to attract night-flying insects for pollination. The flower stalks are covered in a mat of fine hairs as are the branchlets on which they are attached. The flowers appear in November and December (Spring). The lower half of the petal forms a bell-like structure enclosed in sepals covered in a fine mat of grey hairs, while the upper half of each is reflexed to reveal yellow anther tips.

Pittosporum ralphii capsules are 1.5 cm (0.59 in) long and the inner surface of each valve is pale yellow to orange. The fruit takes about a year to ripen and is composed of three compartments which are open to reveal the seeds.

The wood of Pittosporum ralphii is very pale brownish to nearly white throughout, luster medium, with fine texture. The wood has a straight grain and is moderately hard and heavy. It has small pores visible with a hand lens.

== Range ==
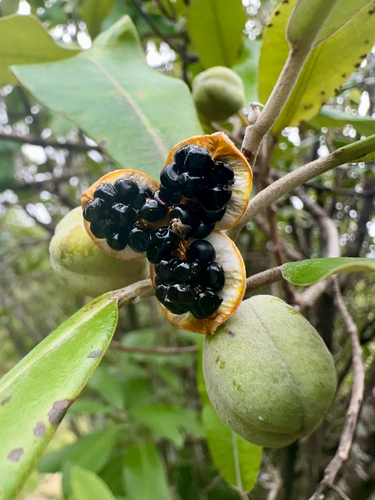
Pittosporum ralphii, showing black seeds

Endemic to New Zealand, Pittosporum ralphii can be found on the East Cape to Northern Wairarapa, and along the Wairarapa and Pātea rivers. It has also become naturalised further south in both the North and South Island.

== Habitat ==
Pittosporum ralphii is found between sea level and 900 metres (3,000 ft) in lowland and hill country forest. It usually occurs along forest margins and stream sides, or as a component of a low forest or shrub-land. It is an adaptable species, and can be grown successfully in both the open, exposed to full sunlight, or in the shade. It creates excellent shelter and is often planted on dry or windy hill sides. Pittosporum ralphii is also fairly tolerant of coastal conditions.

Pittosporum ralphii prefers well-drained soil. It is tolerant of most conditions (except extreme wet) but prefers a location that protects it from extreme winds. As a seedling it likes moisture but it becomes far more drought-tolerant once established.

== Ecology ==
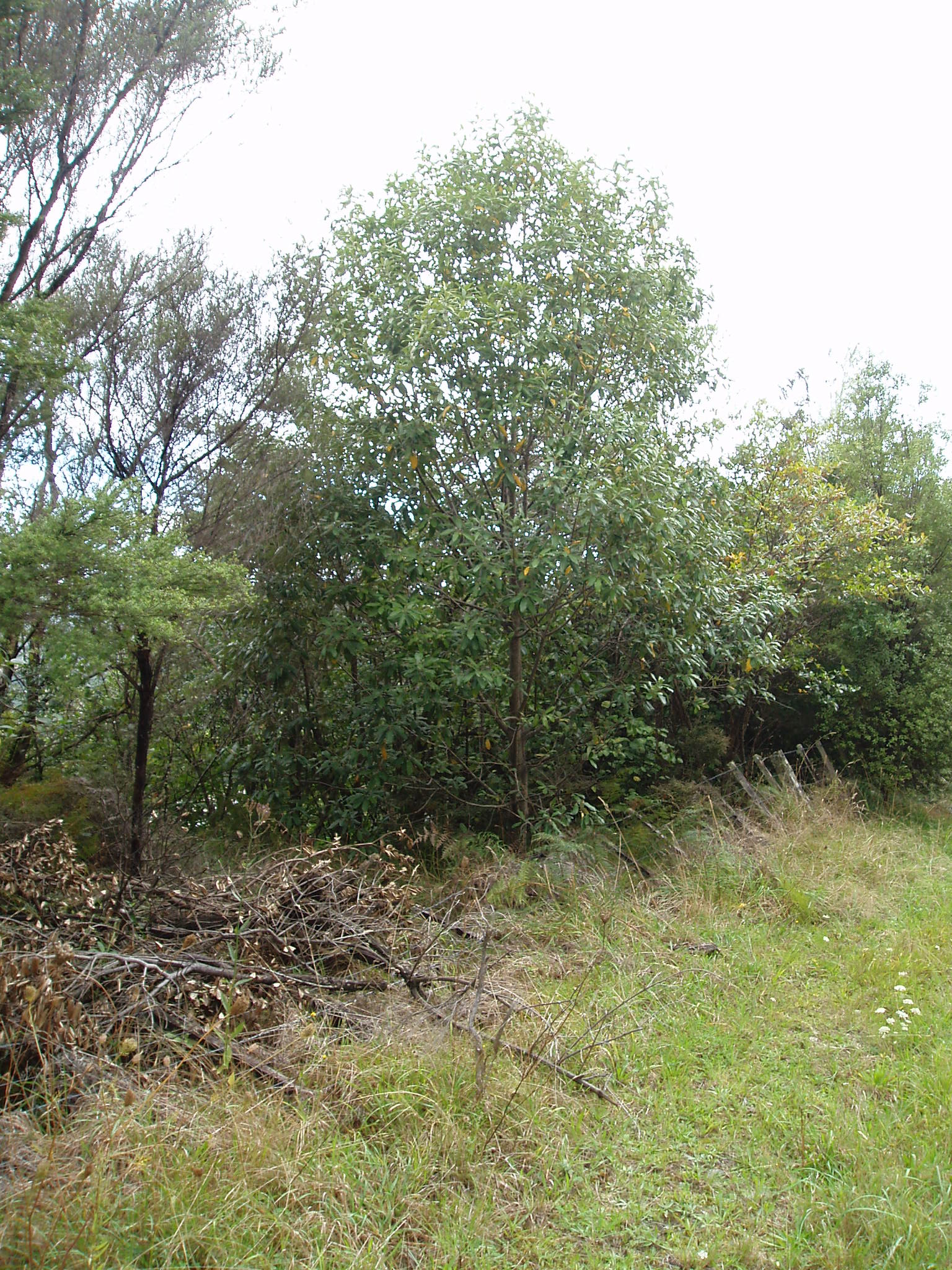
Pittosporum ralphii tree.

=== Life cycle and phenology ===
Pittosporum ralphii flowers between September and December and it fruits between November and January. Seed appears spontaneously in gardens because the seeds are dispersed by exotic and indigenous birds.

=== Predators, parasites and diseases ===
The main predators of Pittosporum ralphii include aphids, thrips, and scale insects, as well as deer and rabbits.

== Other Information ==
Pittosporum ralphii contains saponins.
