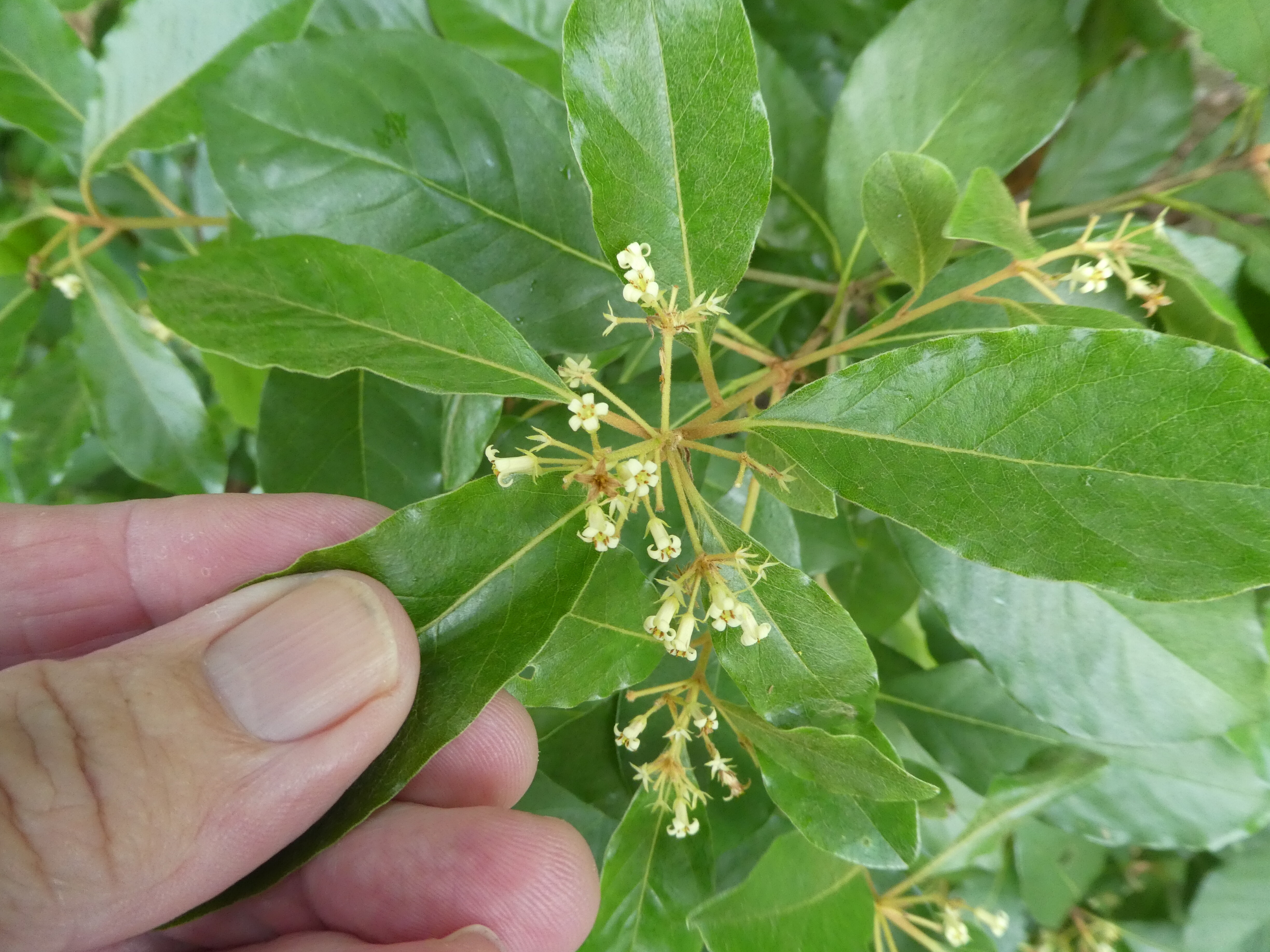
- Flowering in Cairns

Conservation status
- Least Concern (NCA)

Scientific classification
- Kingdom: Plantae
- Clade: Tracheophytes
- Clade: Angiosperms
- Clade: Eudicots
- Clade: Asterids
- Order: Apiales
- Family: Pittosporaceae
- Genus: Pittosporum
- Species: P. tinifolium

Binomial name
- Pittosporum tinifolium A.Cunn.

Synonyms
- Pittosporum ferrugineum subsp. tinifolium (A.Cunn.) L.W.Cayzer, Crisp & I.Telford; Pittosporum queenslandicum Domin

= Pittosporum tinifolium =

Species of flowering plant

Pittosporum tinifolium is a species of plants in the family Pittosporaceae. It is a shrub or small tree growing up to about 5 m (16 ft) tall, which inhabits woodlands, thickets and scrubs. It is native to eastern Queensland, Australia, and was first described in 1839.

== Conservation ==
This species is listed as least concern under the Queensland Government's Nature Conservation Act. As of 4 May 2025, it has not been assessed by the International Union for Conservation of Nature (IUCN).

== Gallery ==
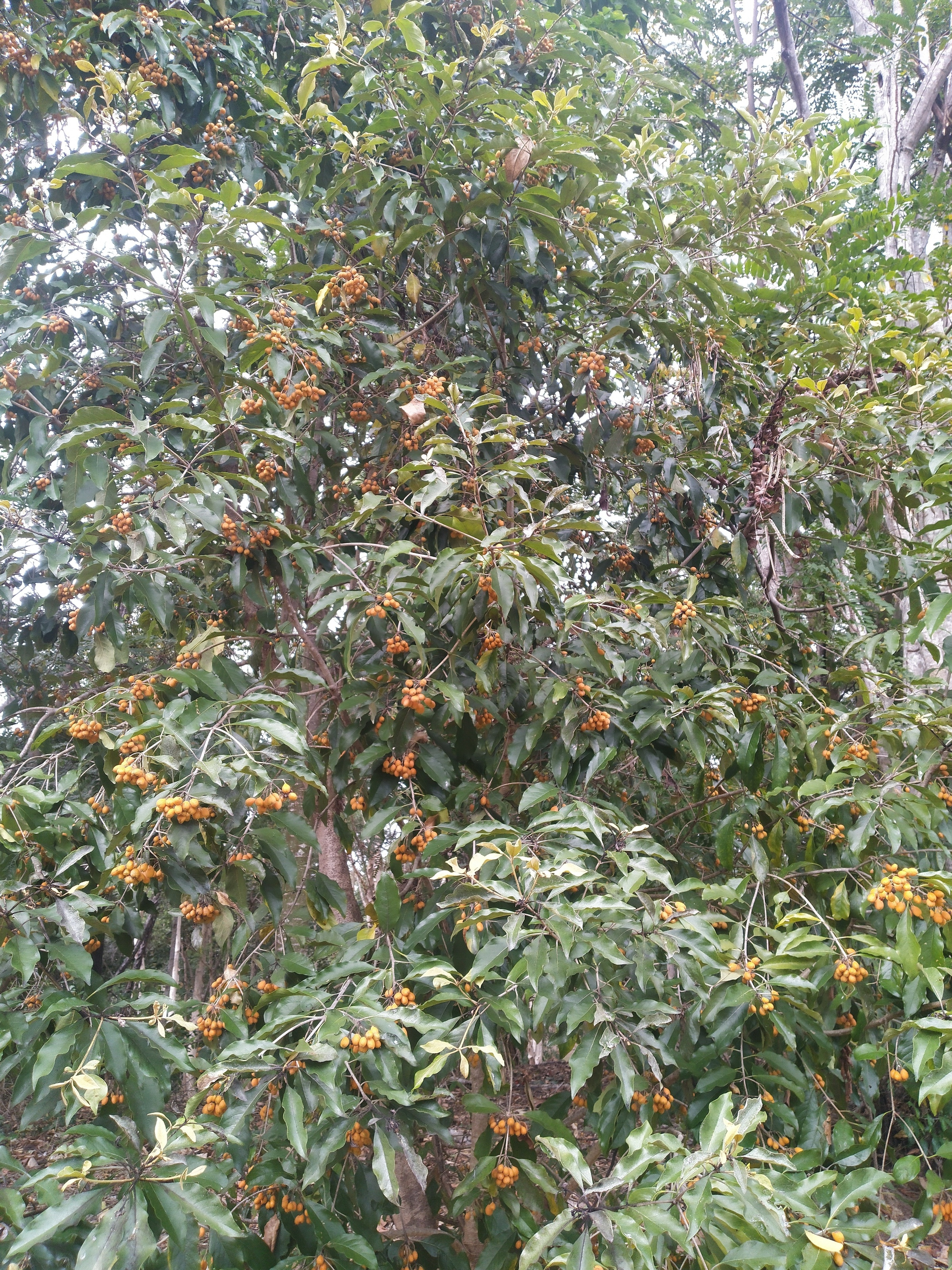
Habit

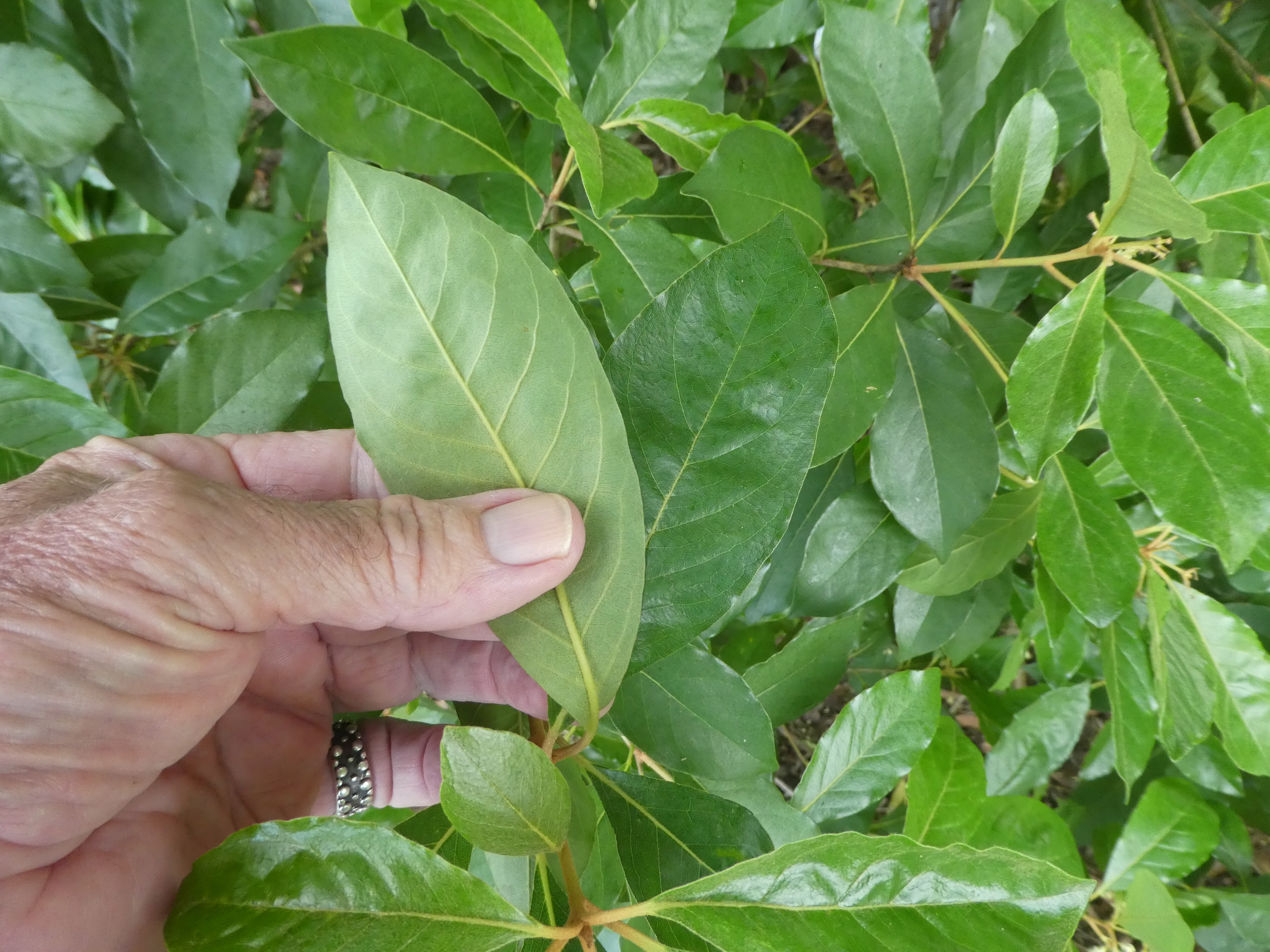
Foliage

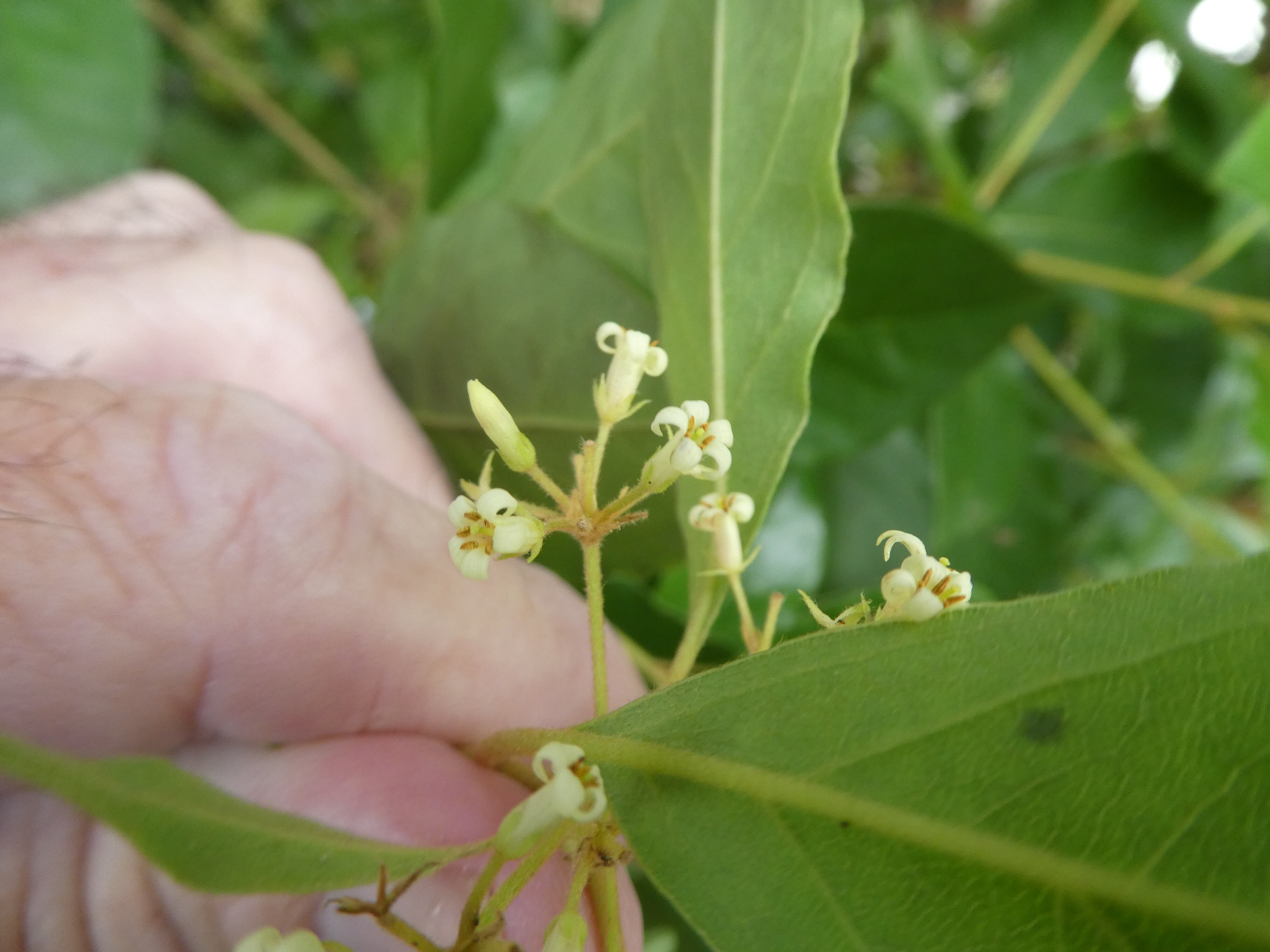
Flowers

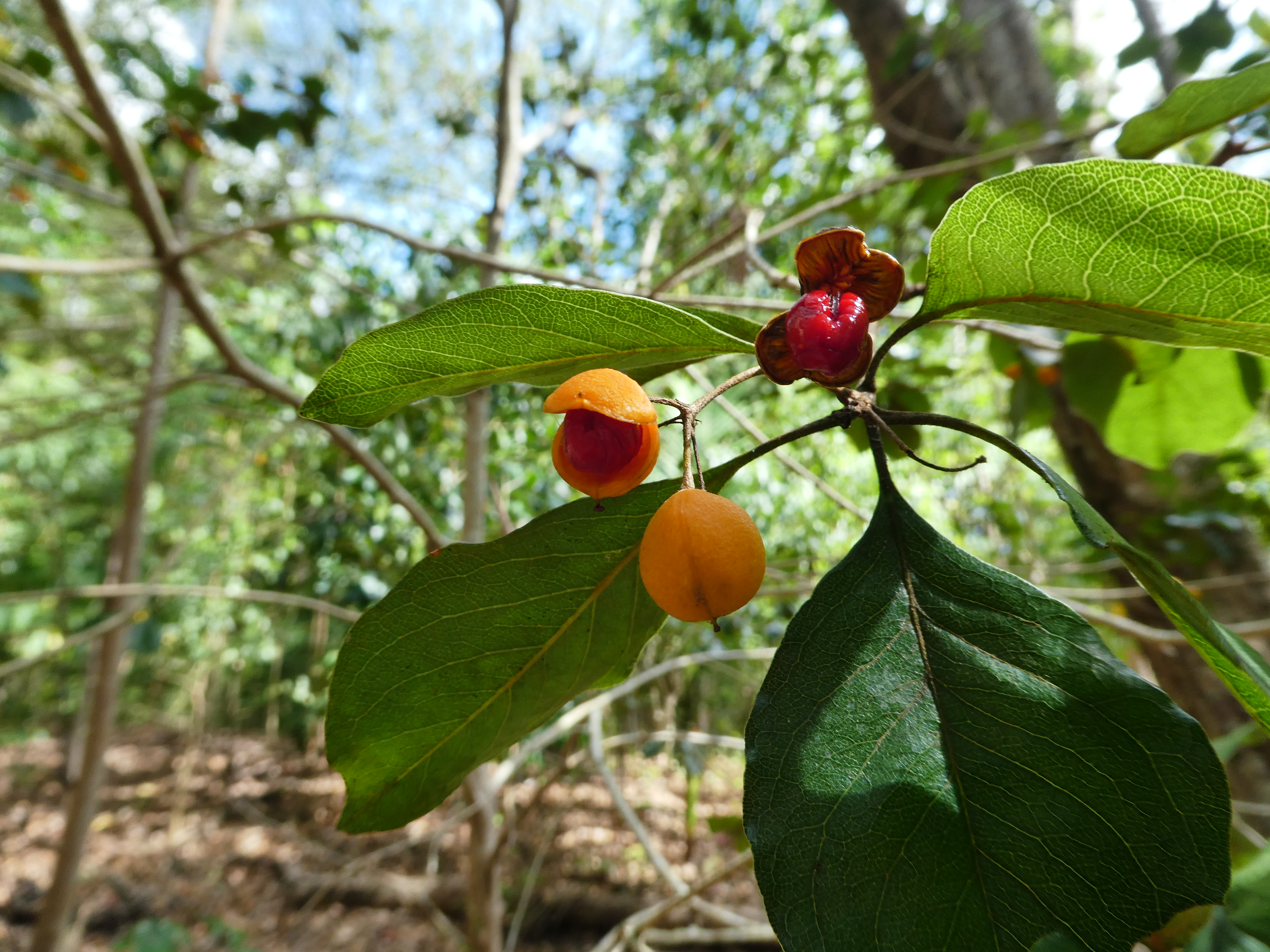
Fruit
