= Pittosporum ramiflorum =

Conservation status
- Least Concern (IUCN 3.1)

Scientific classification
- Kingdom: Plantae
- Clade: Tracheophytes
- Clade: Angiosperms
- Clade: Eudicots
- Clade: Asterids
- Order: Apiales
- Family: Pittosporaceae
- Genus: Pittosporum
- Species: P. ramiflorum

Binomial name
- Pittosporum ramiflorum (Zoll. & Moritzi) Zoll. ex Miq.

Synonyms
- Glyaspermum ramiflorum Zoll. & Moritzi

Species of plant

Pittosporum ramiflorum is a plant in the family Pittosporaceae. The specific epithet ramiflorum means 'branch flowers', referring to inflorescences growing directly from the branches.

== Description ==
Pittosporum ramiflorum grows as a shrub or tree up to 20 m (70 ft) tall, occasionally to 30 m (100 ft). The leathery leaves are obovate and measure up to 18 cm (7 in) long. The inflorescences, on bare sections of the branch, feature white flowers.

== Distribution and habitat ==
Pittosporum ramiflorum is native to an area from the Philippines in the north, to Java in the west to the Solomon Islands in the east. Its habitat is montane forests at elevations of 1,000–2,800 m (3,300–9,200 ft).
