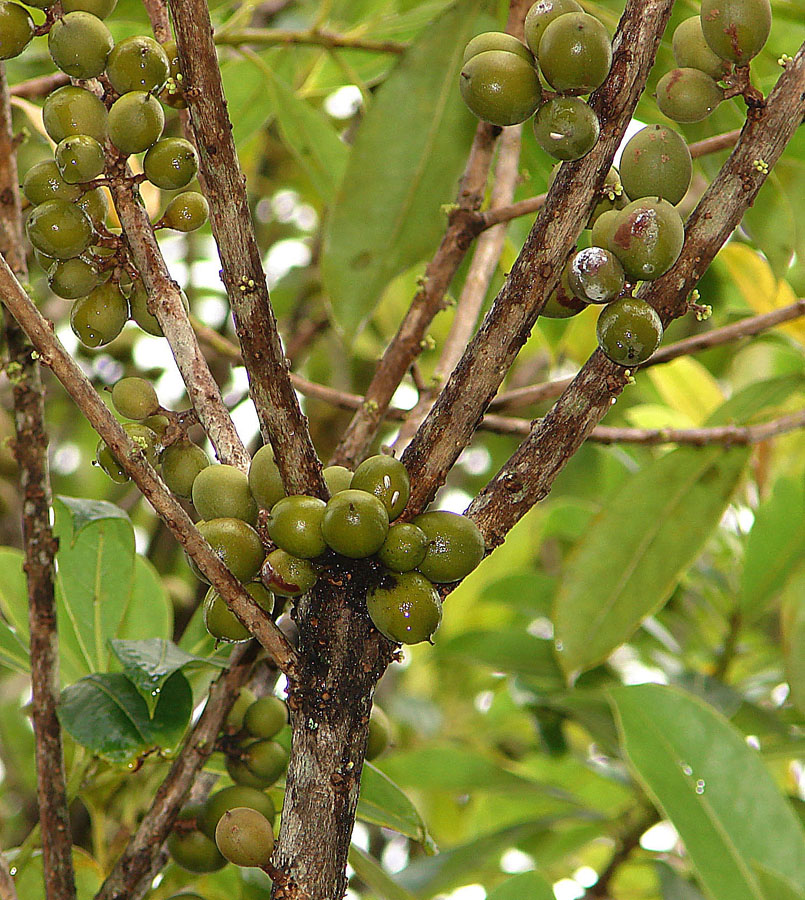

Scientific classification
- Kingdom: Plantae
- Clade: Tracheophytes
- Clade: Angiosperms
- Clade: Eudicots
- Clade: Asterids
- Order: Apiales
- Family: Pittosporaceae
- Genus: Pittosporum
- Species: P. resiniferum

Binomial name
- Pittosporum resiniferum Hemsl.

Synonyms
- Pittosporum resiniferum var. orbiculatum Merr.

= Pittosporum resiniferum =

Petroleum nut

Species of tree

Pittosporum resiniferum, the resin cheesewood or petroleum nut, is a tree that grows in the Philippines and Malaysia, particularly in the wilderness surrounding the Mayon Volcano and in the Cordillera of the Philippines and Mount Kinabalu of Sabah, Malaysia. The petroleum nut derives its name from the resemblance of the fruit's odor to petroleum-based fuels. The fruits of the tree burn brightly when ignited, and can be used for illumination as torches or candles. Its fruit is also highly suitable for use in producing biofuel. This use has been encouraged by the Philippines Department of Agrarian Reform and the Philippine Coconut Authority.

In the Philippine Cordilleras petroleum nut is locally known as apisang, abkel, abkol and da-il, is found among other trees like oak and other mossy forest species. It can also grow well with pine trees.

The oil obtained from the fruit contains a dihydroterpene(C_{10}H_{18}) and also considerable quantities of normal heptane, which had only twice before been found in nature, occurring in the Grey Pine (Pinus sabiniana) and the related Jeffrey Pine (Pinus jeffreyi) of California The oil can be distilled into a very pure form of n-Heptane.
