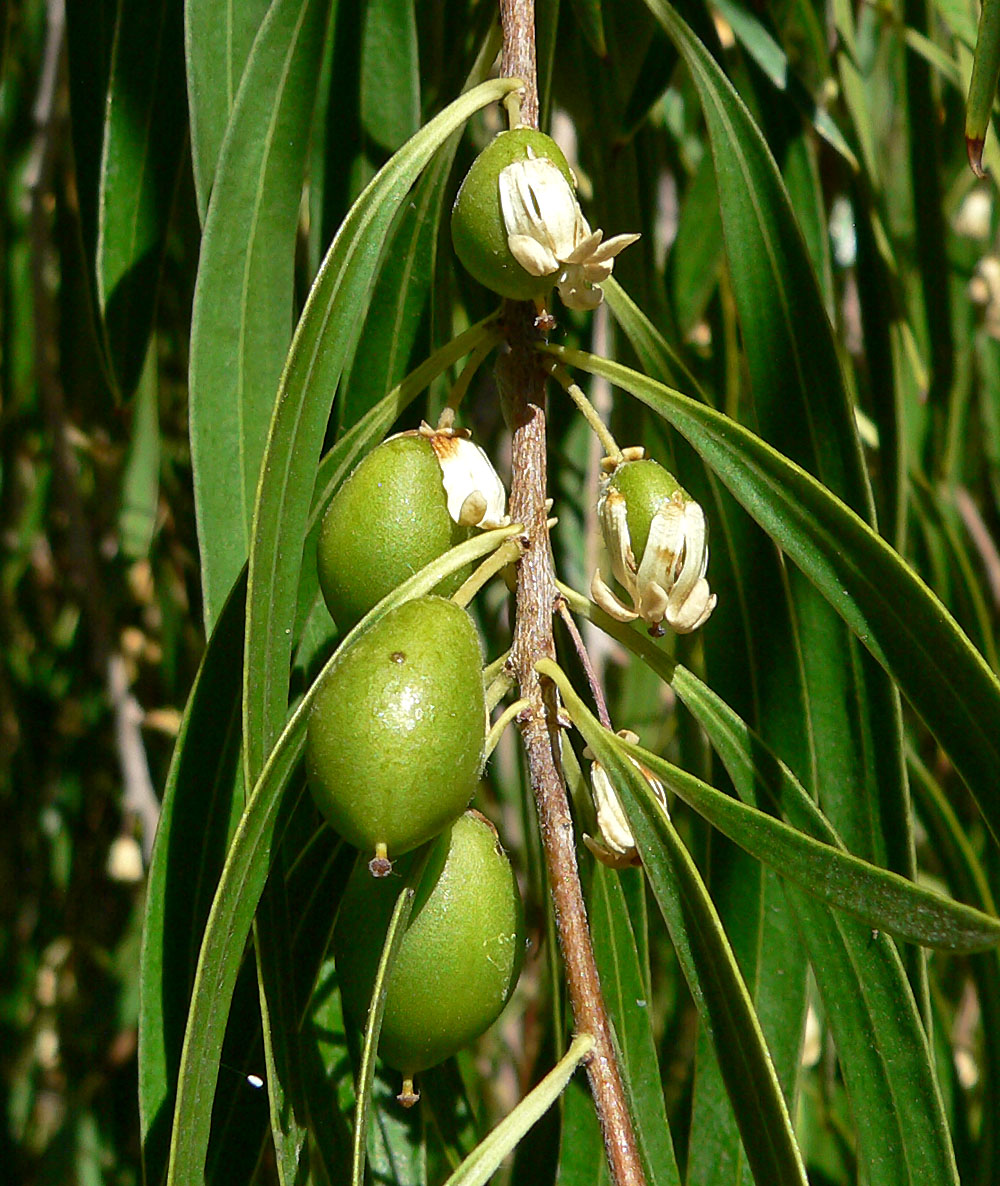

Scientific classification
- Kingdom: Plantae
- Clade: Tracheophytes
- Clade: Angiosperms
- Clade: Eudicots
- Clade: Asterids
- Order: Apiales
- Family: Pittosporaceae
- Genus: Pittosporum
- Species: P. phillyreoides

Binomial name
- Pittosporum phillyreoides DC.

= Pittosporum phillyreoides =

Species of tree

Pittosporum phillyreoides, with the common names weeping pittosporum and willow pittosporum, is a shrub or small columnar tree in the Apiales order, endemic to Australia.

== Taxonomy ==
This species is subject to some taxonomic confusion. It was originally published by Augustin Pyramus de Candolle in 1824, as a species native to a narrow coastal strip of northern Western Australia, the epithet "phillyreoides" referring to a similarity with Phillyrea. Two more Western Australian species — P. angustifolium and P. ligustrifolium— were published over the next 15 years, and George Bentham later lumped together all three as a single species under the misspelled name P. phillyraeoides. These three were re-split in a 2000 classification revision. but in the 2001 ARS Systematic Botanists revision, Pittosporum phillyreoides was recombined and became a synonym for Pittosporum angustifolium. Neither circumscription has yet won universal acceptance.

== Distribution ==
The 'original true' Pittosporum phillyreoides named by Augustin Pyramus de Candolle was only native to a narrow coastal strip of northern Western Australia.

When considered as the synonym, Pittosporum angustifolium is native across Australia in New South Wales, Queensland, South Australia, Victoria, Western Australia, and the Northern Territory.

== Cultivation ==
Pittosporum phillyreoides, a name still seen used in the plant nursery trade, is cultivated as an ornamental tree for planting in gardens. It has a somewhat columnar growth with weeping form and foliage texture, and is drought tolerant once established.
