= Pittosporum taitense =

Conservation status
- Least Concern (IUCN 3.1)

Scientific classification
- Kingdom: Plantae
- Clade: Embryophytes
- Clade: Tracheophytes
- Clade: Angiosperms
- Clade: Eudicots
- Clade: Asterids
- Order: Apiales
- Family: Pittosporaceae
- Genus: Pittosporum
- Species: P. taitense

Binomial name
- Pittosporum taitense Putt. (1839)

Synonyms
- Pittosporum lequerrei Guillaumin; Pittosporum undulatum Guill., nom. illeg. homonym. post.

Species of flowering plant

Pittosporum taitense is a species of flowering plant in the Pittosporaceae family. It is a tree endemic to the Society Islands of French Polynesia.
