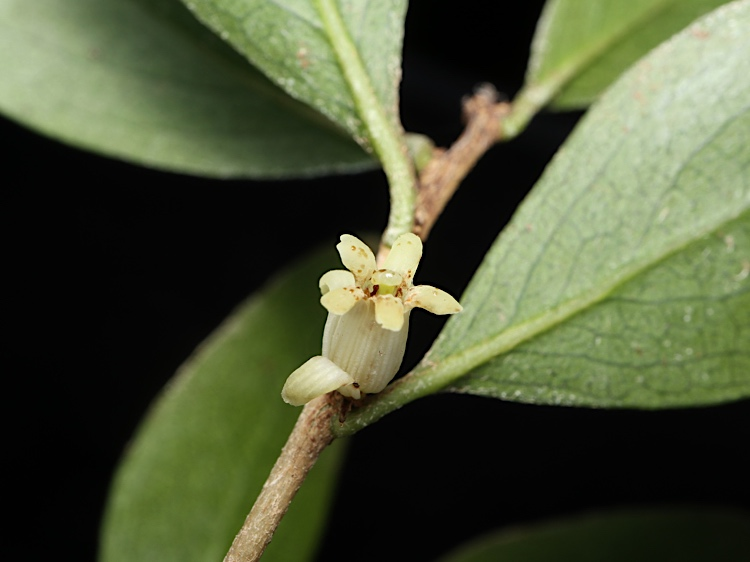
- In the ANBG

Scientific classification
- Kingdom: Plantae
- Clade: Tracheophytes
- Clade: Angiosperms
- Clade: Eudicots
- Clade: Asterids
- Order: Apiales
- Family: Pittosporaceae
- Genus: Pittosporum
- Species: P. lancifolium

Binomial name
- Pittosporum lancifolium (F.M.Bailey) L.W.Cayzer, Crisp & I.Telford

Synonyms
- Citriobatus lanceolatus Stanley nom. inval., pro syn.; Citriobatus lancifolia F.M.Bailey orth. var.; Citriobatus lancifolius F.M.Bailey

= Pittosporum lancifolium =

Narrow-leaved orange thorn

Species of shrub

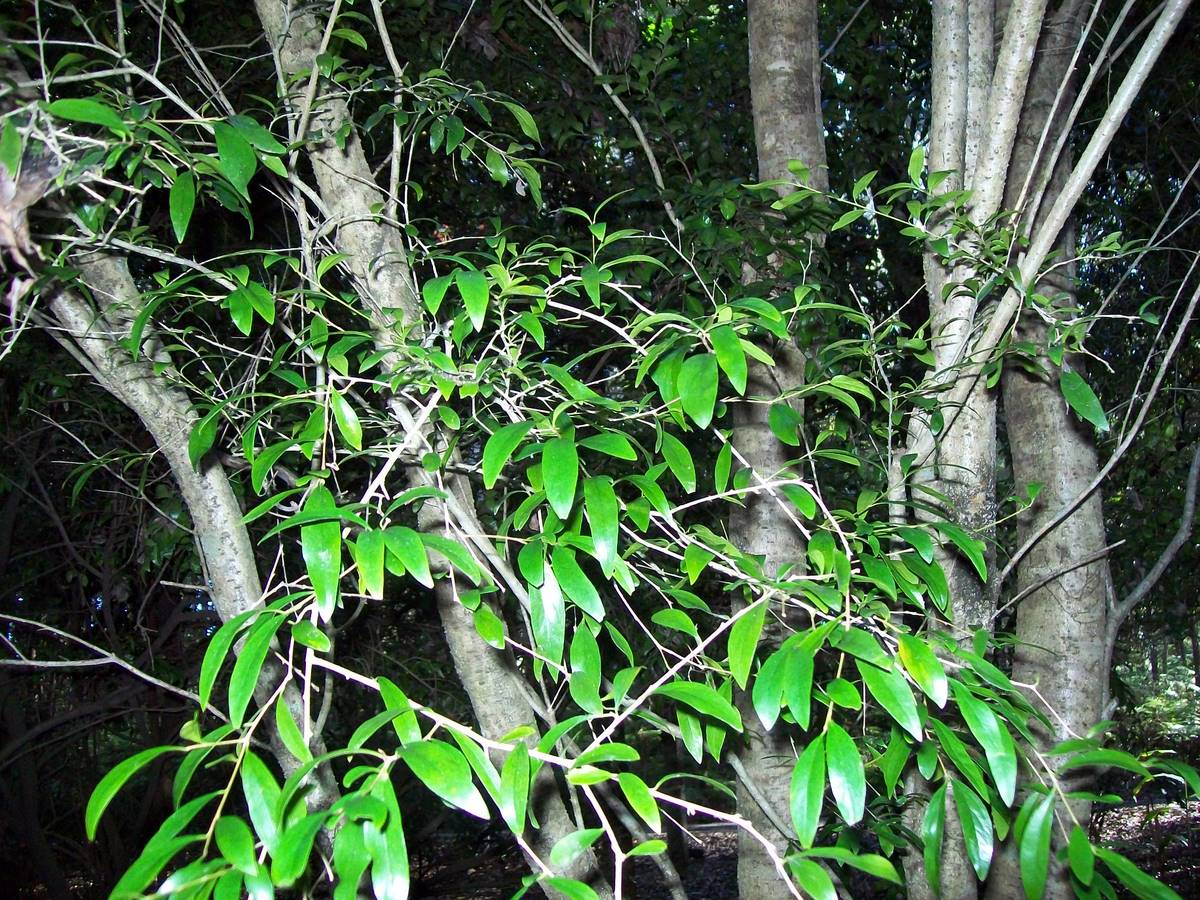
Habit in the North Coast Regional Botanic Garden

Pittosporum lancifolium, commonly known as narrow-leaved orange thorn or sticky orange thorn, is a species of flowering plant in the family Pittosporaceae and is endemic to eastern Australia. It is an erect shrub or small tree with narrowly egg-shaped to elliptic or broadly lance-shaped leaves, sessile flowers arranged singly or in pairs in leaf axils and spherical capsules.

== Description ==
Pittosporum lancifolium is an erect shrub or graceful tree that grows to a height of up to 25 m (82 ft) with a dbh of 30 cm (12 in), but is rarely more than 4 m (13 ft) high. Its bark is whitish, and the branchlets are often spiny. The leaves are arranged alternately, narrowly egg-shaped to elliptic or broadly lance-shaped, usually 15–40 mm (0.59–1.57 in) long and 5–20 mm (0.20–0.79 in) wide on a petiole 1–3 mm (0.039–0.118 in) long. The leaves are glabrous with inconspicuous oil glands on both surfaces. The flowers are sessile, borne singly or in pairs in leaf axils, the sepals of male flowers linear, 2–3 mm (0.079–0.118 in) long, those of female flowers petal-like and up to 6 mm (0.24 in) long. The petals are white or cream-coloured, and form a tube 3–9 mm (0.12–0.35 in) long. Flowering occurs in September and October, and the fruit is a glabrous, spherical purple capsule 6–10 mm (0.24–0.39 in) in diameter containing about ten seeds in a sticky fluid.

== Taxonomy ==
This species was first formally described in 1893 by Frederick Manson Bailey, who gave it the name Citriobatus lancifolius in the Botany Bulletin, Department of Agriculture, Queensland from specimens collected near Killarney. In 2000, Lindy Cayzer, Michael Crisp and Ian Telford transferred the species to Pittosporum as P. lancifolium in Australian Systematic Botany. The specific epithet (lancifolium) refers to the lance-shaped leaves.

== Distribution and habitat ==
Pittosporum lancifolium grows in open areas in or near dry rainforest or in hoop pine scrub between Yarraman in south-east Queensland and Mallanganee National Park near Lismore in northern New South Wales, usually at altitudes more than about 500 m (1,600 ft).
