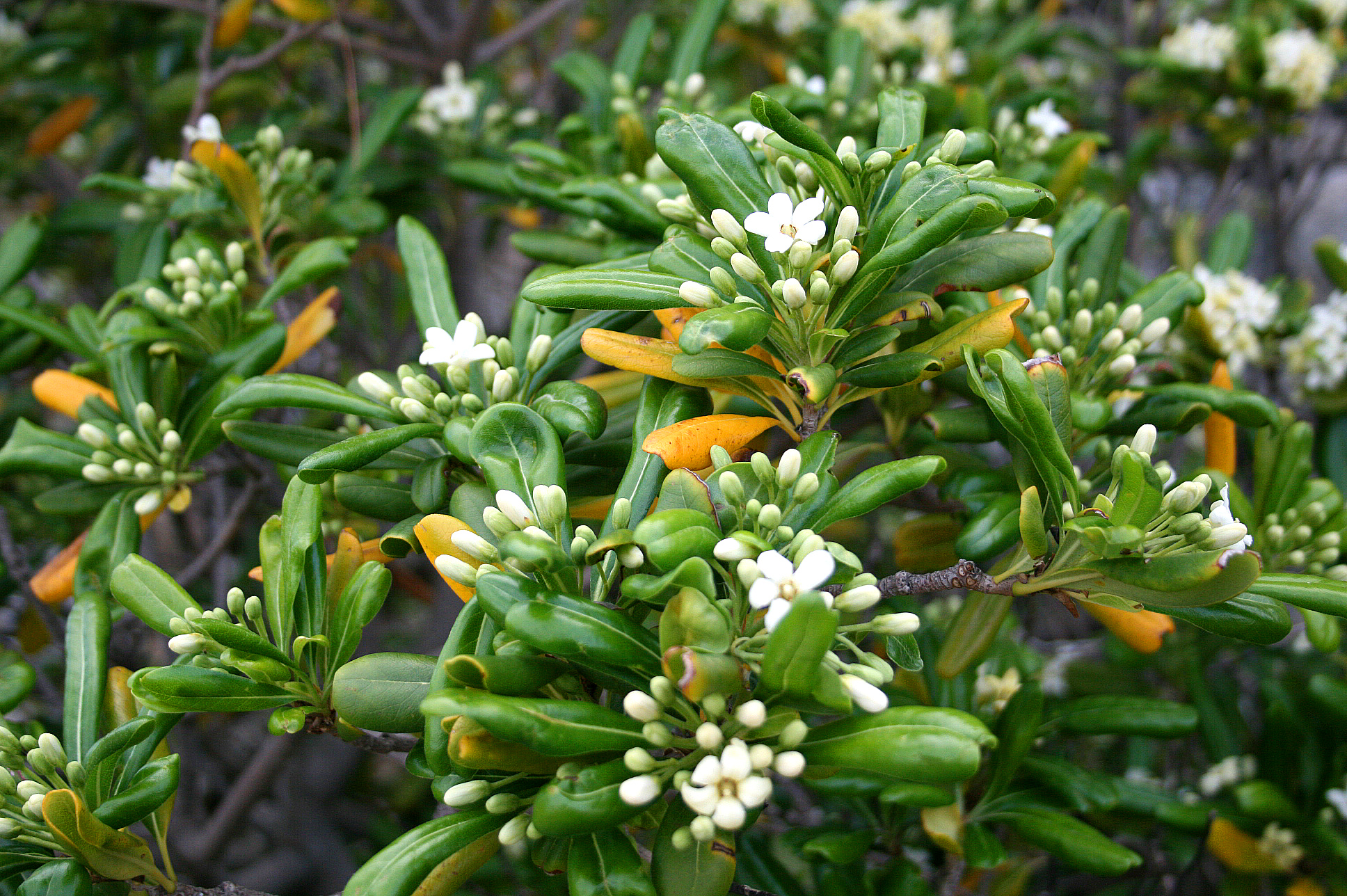
- Leaves and flowers of P. tobira

Scientific classification
- Kingdom: Plantae
- Clade: Tracheophytes
- Clade: Angiosperms
- Clade: Eudicots
- Clade: Asterids
- Order: Apiales
- Family: Pittosporaceae
- Genus: Pittosporum
- Species: P. tobira

Binomial name
- Pittosporum tobira (Thunb.) W.T.Aiton

= Pittosporum tobira =

Species of flowering plant

Pittosporum tobira is a species of sweet-smelling flowering plant in the pittosporum family Pittosporaceae known by several common names, including Australian laurel, Japanese pittosporum, mock orange and Japanese cheesewood. It is native to Japan (south of Kanto), China, Taiwan, and Korea, but it is used throughout the world as an ornamental plant in landscaping and as cut foliage.

== Description ==
Pittosporum tobira fruit in Hampyung, Korea

It is an evergreen shrub which can reach 10 m (33 ft) tall by 3 m (10 ft) broad, and can become treelike. It can also be trimmed into a hedge. The leaves are oval in shape with edges that curl under and measure up to 10 cm (4 in) in length. They are leathery, hairless, darker, and shinier on the upper surfaces. The inflorescence is a cluster of fragrant flowers occurring at the ends of branches. The flower has five white petals each about a centimetre long. The sweet smell of the flowers is reminiscent of orange blossoms and contributes to the "mock orange" common name. The fruit is a hairy, woody capsule about 1 cm wide divided into three valves. Inside are black seeds in a bed of resinous pulp.

=== Distribution ===
It is native to parts of Eastern Asia but has been introduced as an ornamental plant in many parts of the world. In China, it is found in the Fujian province and has been introduced in several others. In Japan, it is found in Honshu and the islands of Kyushu, Shikoku, as well as the Ryukyu Islands. It is also found in South Korea and northern Taiwan. It has been introduced to parts of the United States, and may be found in California, North Carolina, Georgia, and Florida.

It grows in forests, limestone areas, slopes, sandy seashores, and roadsides, usually to 1,800 m (5,900 ft) above sea level.

=== Taxonomy and phylogeny ===
P. tobira is one of over 200 species of the genus Pittosporum which also includes kōhūhū and tarata. Phylogenetic research suggests P. japonicum, P. glabratum, P. illicioides, and P. balfouri are closely related.

== Names and etymology ==
The binomial qualifier tobira derives from the Japanese name for the plant. The genus name Pittosporum derives from the Greek substantives pitta (meaning "pitch") and sporos (meaning "seed") in reference to the resinous substance that surrounds the seed.

In Japan and China, where it is native, it is known as tobera (トベラ) and hǎitóng huā (海桐花) respectively. Its Japanese name, tobera, comes from "tobira no ki" which roughly translates to "door tree". This is because the plant emits a foul odour when leaves or branches are cut and so it was hung up in doorways during Setsubun along with the heads of sardines.

In English, it is known as Japanese pittosporum, mock orange, Australian-laurel, and Japanese cheesewood. In German it is also known as chinesischer Klebsame ("Chinese sticky seed") or Pechsame (Pech, "pitch, tar"; Same, "seed"). In Swedish it is called glansbuske ("glossy shrubs"). In Brazilian Portuguese, it is known as lágrima-sabéia ("teardrop"), pau-de-incenso ("incense stick"), or pitósporo-japonês.

== Chemistry ==
Pittosporum tobira seeds
Nutritional value per 100 g (3.5 oz)
- Energy: 385.65 kcal (1,613.6 kJ)
- Carbohydrates: 71.25 g
- Fat: 5.61 g
- Protein: 12.54 g
Vitamins and minerals
Minerals	Quantity %DV^{†}
Calcium	11% 140 mg
Iron	17% 3.05 mg
Magnesium	87% 367.47 mg
Manganese	47% 1.08 mg
Potassium	24% 723.36 mg
Sodium	1% 26.01 mg
Zinc	18% 2.01 mg
- Other constituents: Quantity
- Water: 8.02 g
- Caffeic acid: 3,857 mg
- Ferulic acid: 2,007 mg
- p-coumaric acid: 1,285 mg
- ^{†}Percentages estimated using US recommendations for adults, except for potassium, which is estimated based on expert recommendation from the National Academies.

Although not typically considered edible, the nutritional composition of P. tobira seeds have been analyzed. The seeds are mostly carbohydrates (71.3%) while their low fat content (5.6%) means it cannot be classified as an oily seed. The high ash content may suggest the presence of considerable amounts of inorganic nutrients in this plant.

The total phenolic content was 102.7 mg gallic acid equivalents per gram (GAE/g) while the total flavonoid content was 31.62 mg of catechin equivalent per gram dry weight basis (CAE/g DW).

An HPLC analysis revealed the presence of five phenolic acids with caffeic acid being the most numerous (38.57 mg/g). The next most common phenolic acids were ferulic acid (20.07 mg/g), p-coumaric acid (12.85 mg/g), cinnamic acid (5.14 mg/g), and gallic acid (1.03 mg/g). Nineteen components were found to makeup 89.5% of the total essential oil content with oxygenated sesquiterpenes being most present (57.5%) followed by sesquiterpene hydrocarbons (11.8%) and oxygenated monoterpenes (6.7%). Spathulenol was the most representative component (48.0%), followed by isospathulenol (5.8%), δ-Elemene (4.2%), λ-gurjunene (4.0%) and camphor (3.7%). Additionally, it was found that P. tobira seed essential oils exhibited important antioxidant activity.

Methanol extracts of P. tobira was found to control more than 90% development of rice blast, an important rice pathogen for commercial rice production, at 1,000 μg/ml.

== Cultivation and uses ==
This shrub is a common, drought-tolerant and fairly hardy landscaping plant. Many cultivars have been developed, including dwarf forms (such as Wheeler's dwarf) and the popular 'Variegata', which has variegated leaves. It is used for hedges, living privacy screens, and indoor and outdoor planter boxes. The stems, leaves, and dried fruits are used in flower arrangements.

P. tobira is suitable for a Mediterranean climate, but may be more sensitive than other common ornamental plants to drought-induced stress. In 2014, a study comparing the effects of drought stress of five common ornamental plants found P. tobira to be the only plant whose total dry biomass was significantly affected (noting a 19% decrease in biomass). The plant may also be useful for fire-resistant landscaping due to its high gross heat of combustion. This plant may also be associated with more damage to other plant species when it is nonnative. A 2016 analysis of 49 plant species in green spaces in Madrid found P. tobira to be among the most likely shrubs to be associated with damage to native plant species.

The species and the cultivar 'Variegatum' have both gained the Royal Horticultural Society's Award of Garden Merit.

== Ecology and interactions ==
Common pests of this plant include various aphids, mites, and leafhoppers, the cotton cushiony scale (Icerya purchasi), and root-knot nematodes (Meloidogyne spp.). It can be attacked by the pit-making pittosporum scale (Planchonia arabidis). It is vulnerable to the fungal plant pathogen Erythricium salmonicolor, which causes galls and the dieback disease known as pink limb blight.

The pathogenic plant fungus Rhizoctonia solani forms white, web-like basidial fructifications on the lower sides of infected leaves of Pittosporum tobira.

The fruits of the plant are not poisonous but not edible. However, they are eaten by bulbuls and other birds in Japan. The sticky substance around the seeds allow them to stick to the beaks of birds and be carried over long distances. The stench given off when broken is thought to have evolved to repel predation from foraging animals but it is a favorite of the sika deer.

== Gallery ==
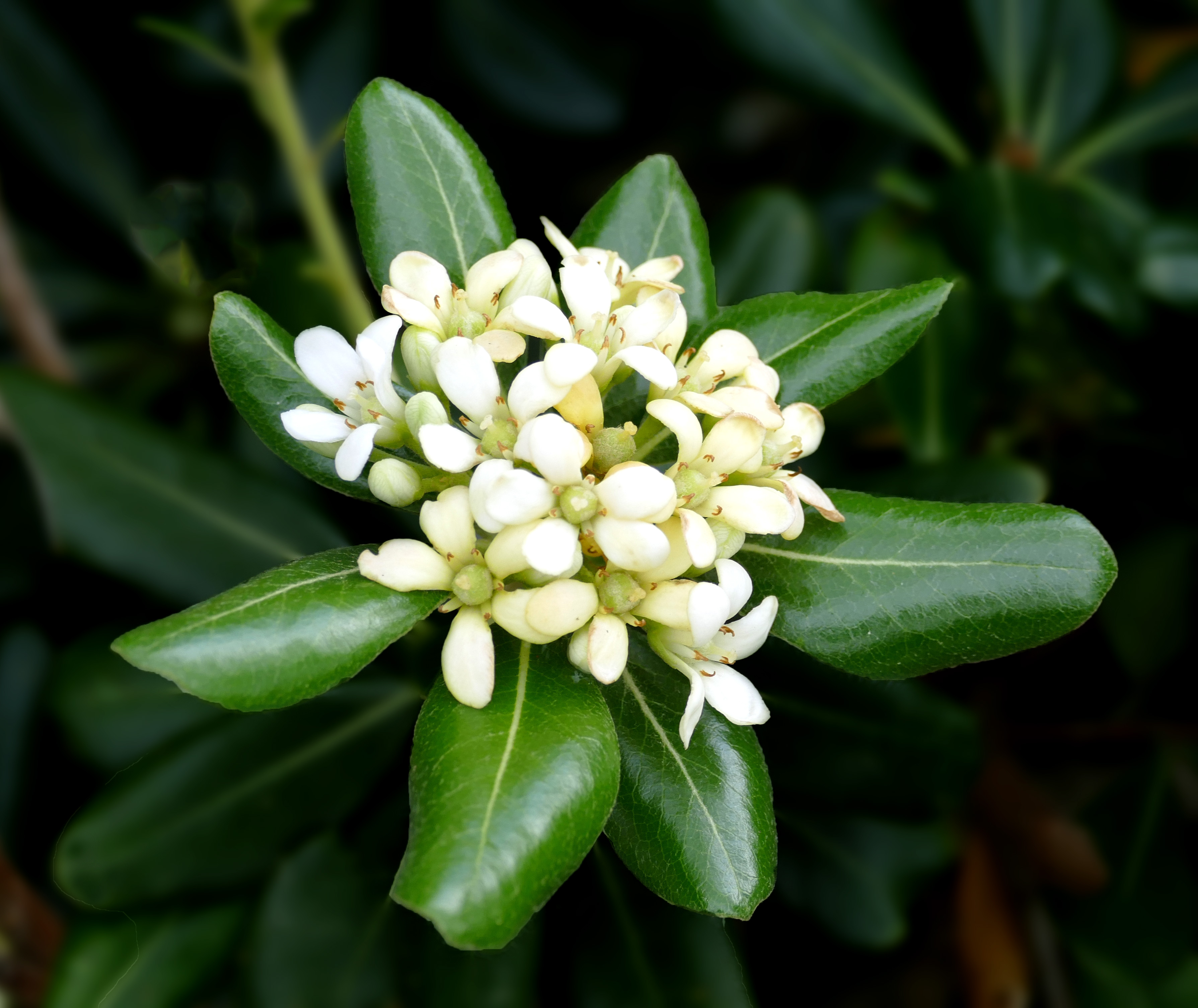
Japanese Cheesewood flowers

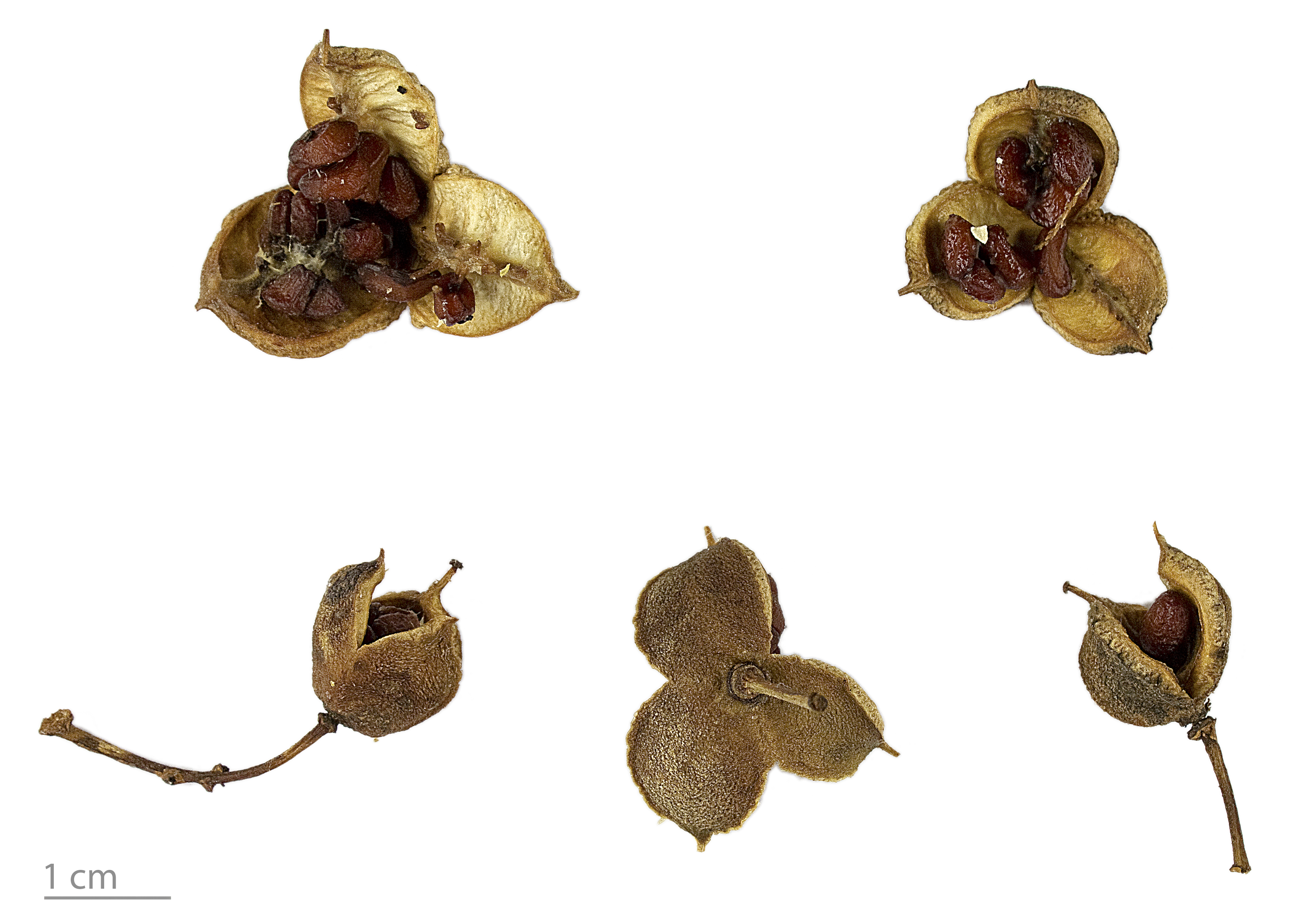
Pittosporum tobira - MHNT

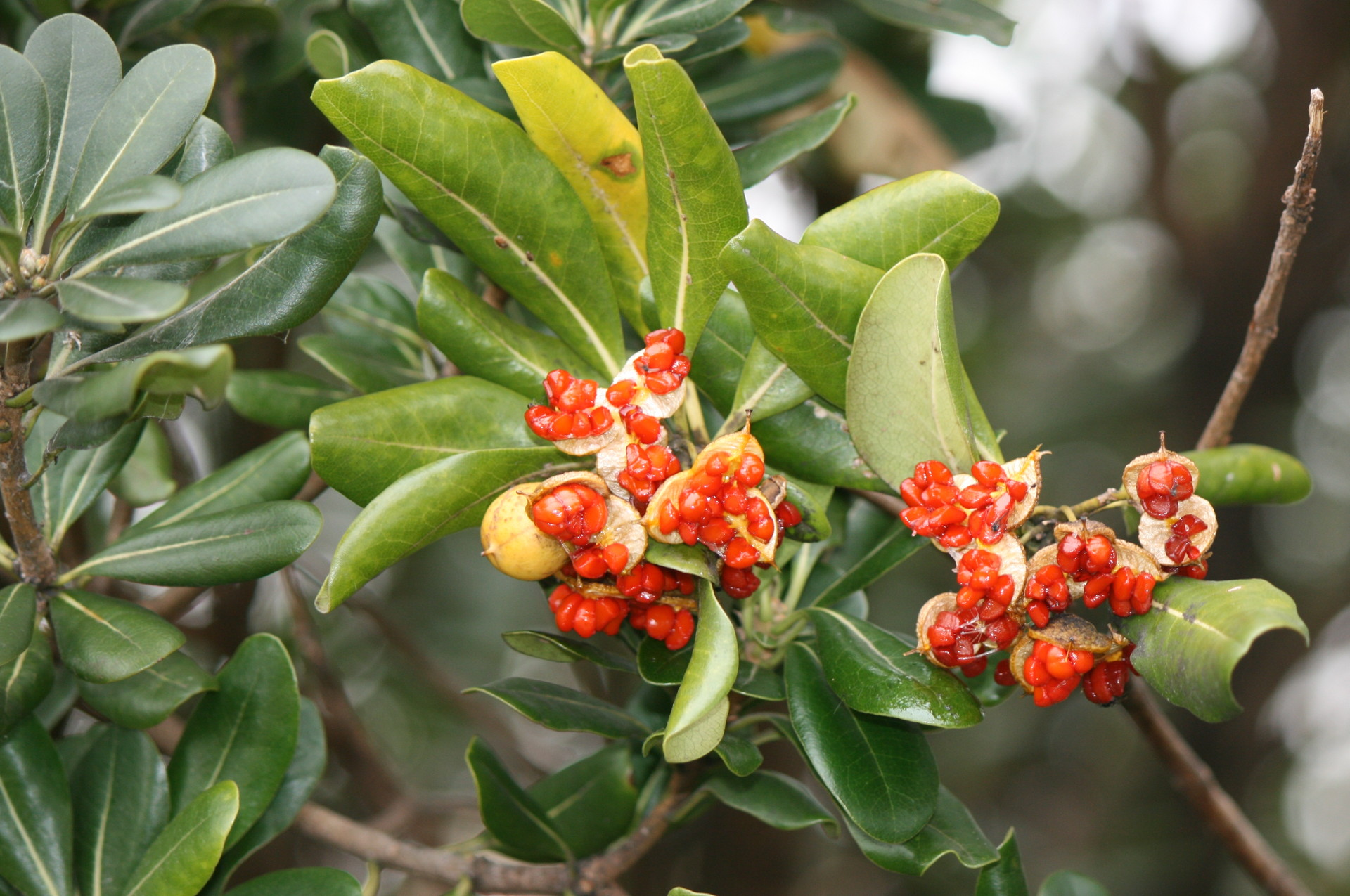
Fruits and seeds in Japan

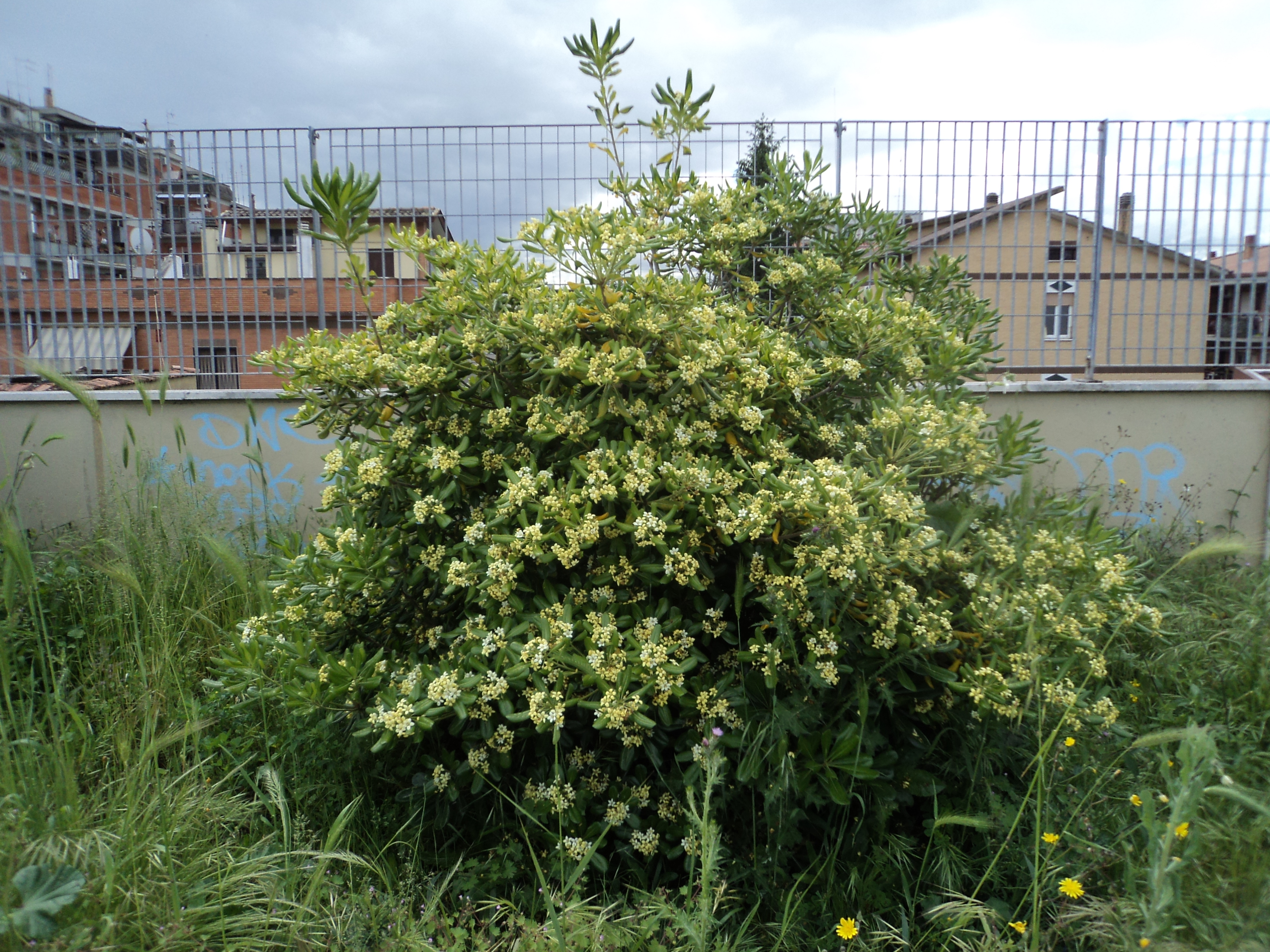
P. tobira growing in Italy
