= Corimelaena obscura =

Scientific classification
- Kingdom: Animalia
- Phylum: Arthropoda
- Class: Insecta
- Order: Hemiptera
- Suborder: Heteroptera
- Family: Thyreocoridae
- Genus: Corimelaena
- Species: C. obscura

Binomial name
- Corimelaena obscura Mcpherson & Sailer, 1978

Species of true bug

Corimelaena obscura is a species of ebony bug in the family Thyreocoridae. It is found in North America.
