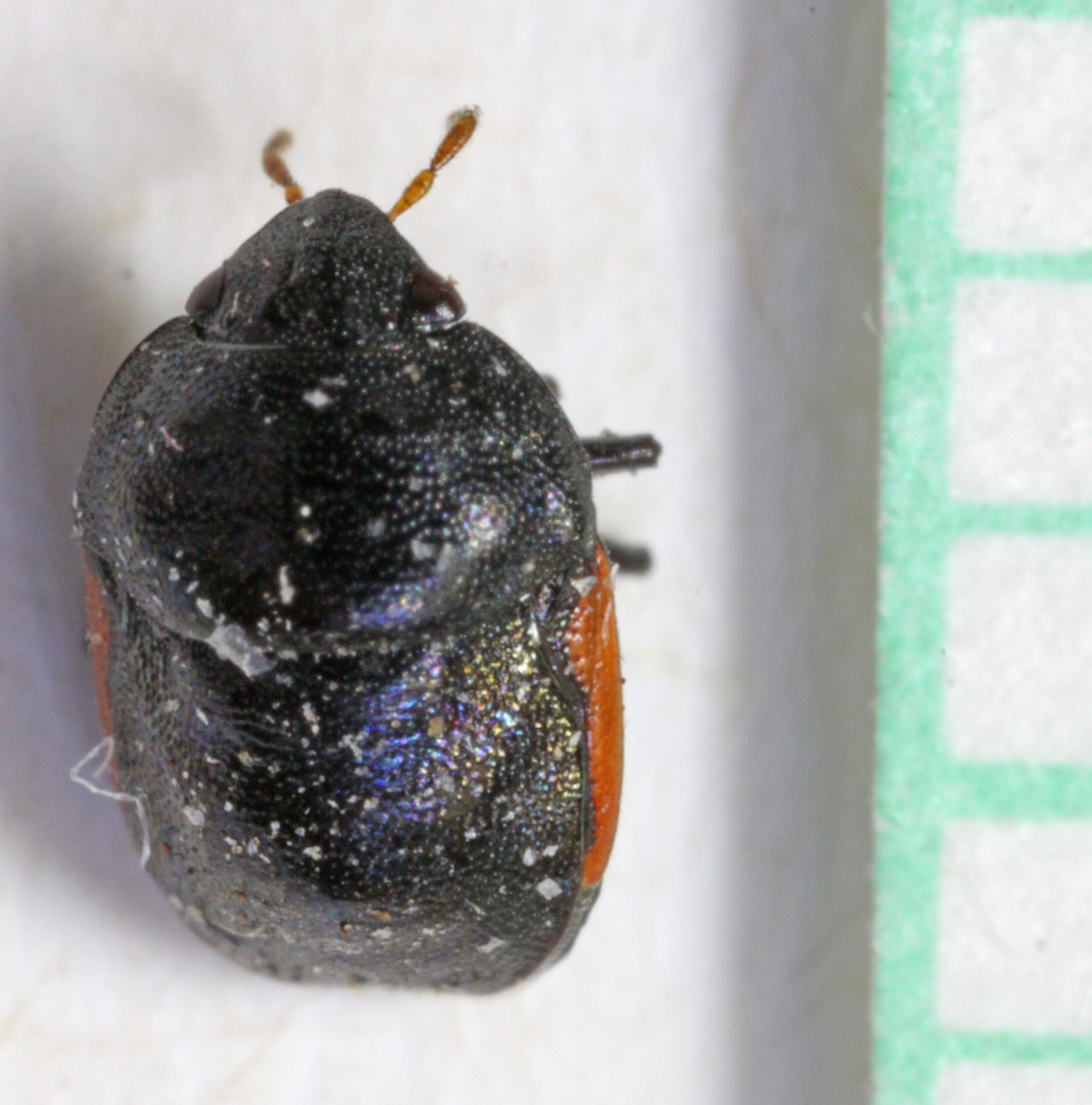

Scientific classification
- Kingdom: Animalia
- Phylum: Arthropoda
- Class: Insecta
- Order: Hemiptera
- Suborder: Heteroptera
- Family: Thyreocoridae
- Genus: Corimelaena
- Species: C. incognita

Binomial name
- Corimelaena incognita (Mcatee & Malloch, 1933)

= Corimelaena incognita =

Species of true bug

Corimelaena incognita is a species of ebony bug in the family Thyreocoridae. It is found in Central America and North America.
