= Cydnoides albipennis =

Scientific classification
- Kingdom: Animalia
- Phylum: Arthropoda
- Class: Insecta
- Order: Hemiptera
- Suborder: Heteroptera
- Family: Thyreocoridae
- Genus: Cydnoides
- Species: C. albipennis

Binomial name
- Cydnoides albipennis (Say, 1859)

Species of true bug

Cydnoides albipennis is a species of black bug in the family Thyreocoridae. It is found in North America.
