= Galgupha atra =

Scientific classification
- Kingdom: Animalia
- Phylum: Arthropoda
- Class: Insecta
- Order: Hemiptera
- Suborder: Heteroptera
- Family: Thyreocoridae
- Genus: Galgupha
- Species: G. atra

Binomial name
- Galgupha atra Amyot & Serville, 1843

Species of true bug

Galgupha atra is a species of ebony bug in the family Thyreocoridae. It is found in Central America and North America.
