= Cydnoides renormatus =

Scientific classification
- Kingdom: Animalia
- Phylum: Arthropoda
- Class: Insecta
- Order: Hemiptera
- Suborder: Heteroptera
- Family: Thyreocoridae
- Genus: Cydnoides
- Species: C. renormatus

Binomial name
- Cydnoides renormatus (Uhler, 1895)

Species of true bug

Cydnoides renormatus is a species of ebony bug in the family Thyreocoridae. It is found in North America.
