= Galgupha aterrima =

Scientific classification
- Kingdom: Animalia
- Phylum: Arthropoda
- Class: Insecta
- Order: Hemiptera
- Suborder: Heteroptera
- Family: Thyreocoridae
- Genus: Galgupha
- Species: G. aterrima

Binomial name
- Galgupha aterrima Malloch, 1919

Species of true bug

Galgupha aterrima is a species of ebony bug in the family Thyreocoridae. It is found in North America.
