= Galgupha nitiduloides =

Scientific classification
- Kingdom: Animalia
- Phylum: Arthropoda
- Class: Insecta
- Order: Hemiptera
- Suborder: Heteroptera
- Family: Thyreocoridae
- Genus: Galgupha
- Species: G. nitiduloides

Binomial name
- Galgupha nitiduloides (Wolff, 1802)

Species of true bug

Galgupha nitiduloides is a species of ebony bug in the family Thyreocoridae. It is found in Central America and North America.

== Subspecies ==
These three subspecies belong to the species Galgupha nitiduloides:

- Galgupha nitiduloides coerulescens (Stål, 1862)
- Galgupha nitiduloides nitiduloides (Wolff, 1902)
- Galgupha nitiduloides texensis McAtee & Malloch, 1933
