= Hoplothrips =

Scientific classification
- Kingdom: Animalia
- Phylum: Arthropoda
- Class: Insecta
- Order: Thysanoptera
- Family: Phlaeothripidae
- Genus: Hoplothrips; Amyot & Serville, 1843

Genus of thrips

Hoplothrips is a genus of thrips in the family Phlaeothripidae, first described in 1843 by Charles Jean-Baptiste Amyot & Jean Guillaume Audinet-Serville. The type species is Thrips corticis DeGeer, 1773.

== Species ==
ITIS lists:

- Hoplothrips absimilis
- Hoplothrips aciculatus
- Hoplothrips agrestis
- Hoplothrips americanus
- Hoplothrips anobii
- Hoplothrips anomocerus
- Hoplothrips argus
- Hoplothrips asper
- Hoplothrips baileyi
- Hoplothrips beachae
- Hoplothrips bradleyi
- Hoplothrips brevitubus
- Hoplothrips breviventris
- Hoplothrips bruneri
- Hoplothrips caespitis
- Hoplothrips calcaratus
- Hoplothrips carpathicus
- Hoplothrips cecidii
- Hoplothrips cephalotes
- Hoplothrips claviger
- Hoplothrips connexus
- Hoplothrips corticis
- Hoplothrips cubensis
- Hoplothrips cunctans
- Hoplothrips dentatus
- Hoplothrips dentiger
- Hoplothrips detector
- Hoplothrips dignus
- Hoplothrips dissonus
- Hoplothrips dubius
- Hoplothrips edentatus
- Hoplothrips eremicola
- Hoplothrips fijiensis
- Hoplothrips flavafemora
- Hoplothrips flavicauda
- Hoplothrips flavipes
- Hoplothrips flavitibia
- Hoplothrips fumiceps
- Hoplothrips fungi
- Hoplothrips fungosus
- Hoplothrips fuscicornis
- Hoplothrips germanae
- Hoplothrips gracilis
- Hoplothrips graminis
- Hoplothrips grassei
- Hoplothrips grisescens
- Hoplothrips guineensis
- Hoplothrips hoerneri
- Hoplothrips hoodi
- Hoplothrips indicus
- Hoplothrips japonicus
- Hoplothrips karnyi
- Hoplothrips kea
- Hoplothrips kincaidi
- Hoplothrips lacteus
- Hoplothrips lanaiensis
- Hoplothrips laticornis
- Hoplothrips leeuweni
- Hoplothrips leibyi
- Hoplothrips lepidulus
- Hoplothrips lichenis
- Hoplothrips longisetis
- Hoplothrips magnaccai
- Hoplothrips magnificus
- Hoplothrips mainlingensis
- Hoplothrips marginalis
- Hoplothrips mathuri
- Hoplothrips melanurus
- Hoplothrips mendosus
- Hoplothrips militaris
- Hoplothrips minutalis
- †Hoplothrips minutatim
- Hoplothrips monspeliensis
- Hoplothrips moultoni
- Hoplothrips muscicola
- Hoplothrips mutabilis
- Hoplothrips nemorius
- Hoplothrips niger
- Hoplothrips occipitalis
- Hoplothrips orbiceps
- Hoplothrips orbiculatus
- Hoplothrips orientalis
- Hoplothrips oriochares
- Hoplothrips orites
- Hoplothrips oudeus
- Hoplothrips pallicornis
- Hoplothrips palmarius
- Hoplothrips papua
- Hoplothrips pedicularius
- Hoplothrips pergandei
- Hoplothrips perkinsi
- Hoplothrips persimilis
- Hoplothrips polypori
- Hoplothrips polysticti
- Hoplothrips poultoni
- Hoplothrips proximus
- Hoplothrips purpureus
- Hoplothrips quercinus
- Hoplothrips recticeps
- Hoplothrips ruber
- Hoplothrips rubicundulus
- Hoplothrips rugosus
- Hoplothrips rzedowskianus
- Hoplothrips semicaecus
- Hoplothrips smithi
- Hoplothrips sordidus
- Hoplothrips spissicornis
- Hoplothrips tejas
- Hoplothrips terminalis
- Hoplothrips testaceus
- Hoplothrips transvaalensis
- Hoplothrips tua
- Hoplothrips tyrannus
- Hoplothrips ulmi
- Hoplothrips unicolor
- Hoplothrips vitreus
- Hoplothrips westfalli
- Hoplothrips xanthocephalus
- Hoplothrips zacualtipanensis
- Hoplothrips zonatus
- Hoplothrips zuluensis
