= Corimelaena agrella =

Scientific classification
- Kingdom: Animalia
- Phylum: Arthropoda
- Class: Insecta
- Order: Hemiptera
- Suborder: Heteroptera
- Family: Thyreocoridae
- Genus: Corimelaena
- Species: C. agrella

Binomial name
- Corimelaena agrella Mcatee, 1919

Species of true bug

Corimelaena agrella is a species of ebony bug in the family Thyreocoridae. It is found in North America.
