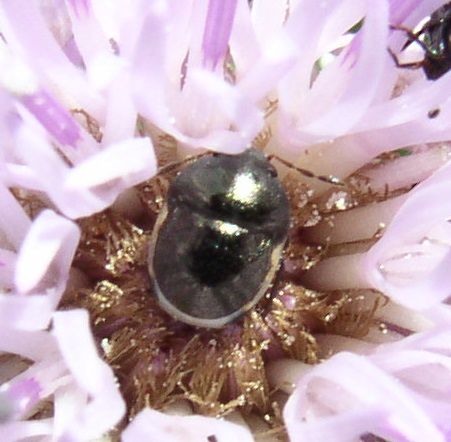
- Corimelaena pulicaria

Scientific classification
- Kingdom: Animalia
- Phylum: Arthropoda
- Class: Insecta
- Order: Hemiptera
- Suborder: Heteroptera
- Family: Thyreocoridae
- Subfamily: Corimelaeninae; Uhler, 1872

= Corimelaeninae =

Subfamily of true bugs

Corimelaeninae is a subfamily of shield bugs within the family Thyreocoridae. It has often been treated as a family (e.g.), but the name Thyreocoridae, published in 1843, has nomenclatural priority over Corimelaenidae, published in 1872.
