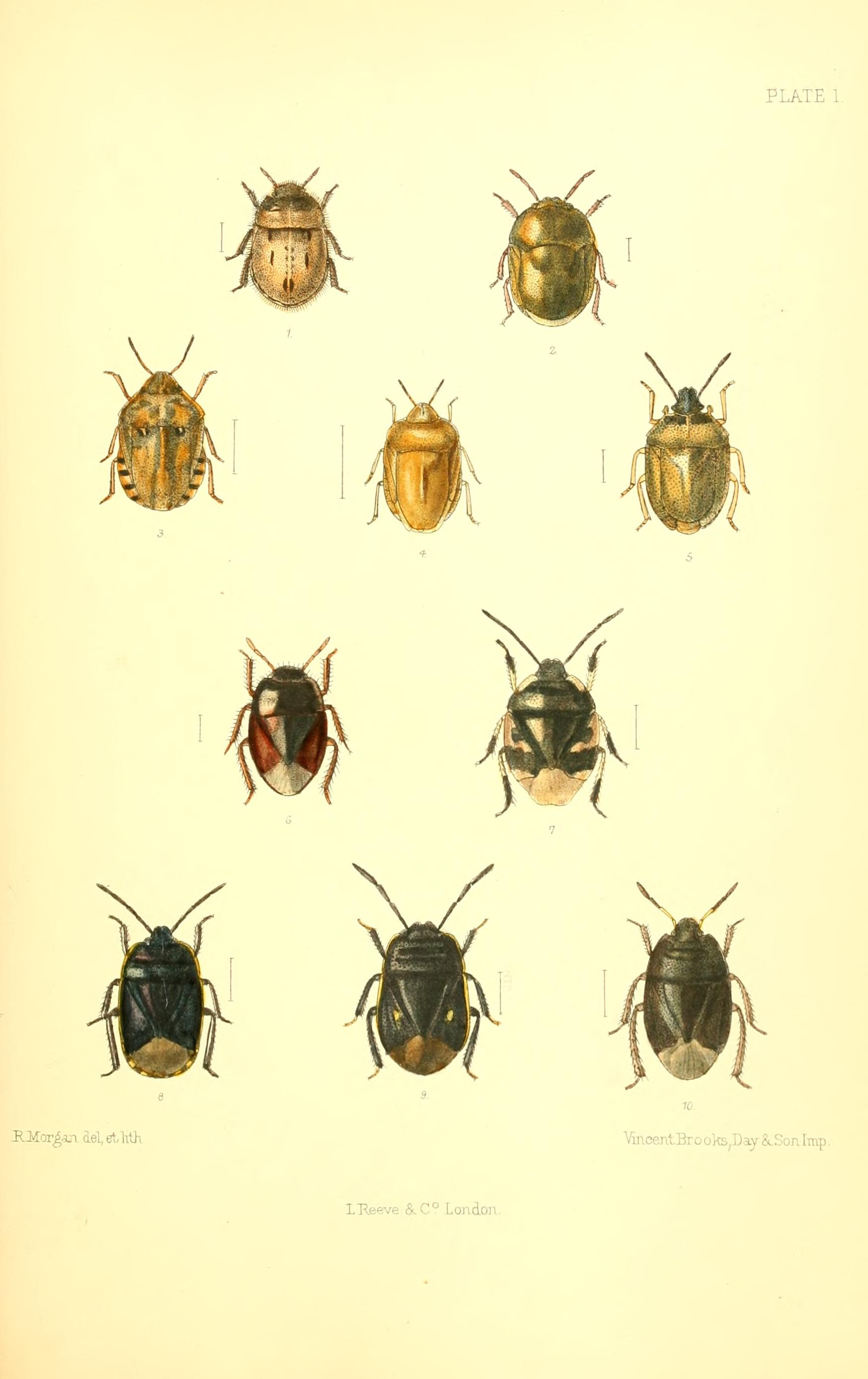
- Thyreocoris scarabaeoides depicted in Saunders Hemiptera Heteroptera of the British Islands (figure 2)

Scientific classification
- Kingdom: Animalia
- Phylum: Arthropoda
- Class: Insecta
- Order: Hemiptera
- Suborder: Heteroptera
- Family: Thyreocoridae
- Genus: Thyreocoris
- Species: T. scarabaeoides

Binomial name
- Thyreocoris scarabaeoides (Linnaeus, 1758)

= Thyreocoris scarabaeoides =

Species of true bug

Thyreocoris scarabaeoides is a species of shield bug found in Europe. It is small (3–4 mm.), nearly round and dark bronzy coloured. The surface is shining, glabrous and strongly punctured. The antennae are piceous, the scutellum not quite covering the corium and membrane. The legs are black with spinose tibiae and piceous tarsi.

The nymphs and adults feed primarily on violets (Viola), but they are found on the ground under different plant species. Initially, the nymphs live in aggregations. Overwintering is under dry leaf and needle litter, under stones or in moss. Mating takes place from April, the egg laying mainly in May and June. The adult animals of the new generation can be found from late July or August. There is a single generation per year.
