= Galgupha =

Scientific classification
- Kingdom: Animalia
- Phylum: Arthropoda
- Class: Insecta
- Order: Hemiptera
- Suborder: Heteroptera
- Family: Thyreocoridae
- Genus: Galgupha; Amyot & Serville, 1843

Subgenera
- Galgupha (Galgupha) Amyot & Serville, 1843; Galgupha (Gyrocnemis) McAtee & Malloch, 1928; Galgupha (Nothocoris) McAtee & Malloch, 1928; Galgupha (Orocoris) McAtee & Malloch, 1933

Genus of true bugs

Galgupha is a genus of bugs in the family Thyreocoridae. There are more than 30 described species in Galgupha.

== Species ==
These 34 species belong to the genus Galgupha:

- Galgupha acuta McAtee & Malloch
- Galgupha anomala McAtee & Malloch
- Galgupha arizonensis (Van Duzee, 1923)
- Galgupha aterrima Malloch, 1919
- Galgupha atra Amyot & Serville, 1843
- Galgupha bakeri McAtee & Malloch, 1933
- Galgupha carinata McAtee & Malloch, 1933
- Galgupha costomaculata McAtee & Malloch
- Galgupha denudata (Uhler, 1863)
- Galgupha diminuta (Van Duzee, 1923)
- Galgupha dimorpha McAtee & Malloch
- Galgupha eas McAtee & Malloch, 1933
- Galgupha euryscytus
- Galgupha fritzi Kormilev
- Galgupha guttiger (Stål, 1862)
- Galgupha haywardi Kormilev
- Galgupha hesperia McAtee & Malloch, 1933
- Galgupha loboprostethia Sailer, 1940
- Galgupha lucretia McAtee & Malloch
- Galgupha mexicana McAtee & Malloch
- Galgupha morbiloci McAtee & Malloch
- Galgupha nitida McAtee & Malloch
- Galgupha nitiduloides (Wolff, 1802)
- Galgupha oblonga McAtee & Malloch
- Galgupha ovalis Hussey, 1925
- Galgupha parae McAtee & Malloch
- Galgupha punctata McAtee & Malloch
- Galgupha punctifer McAtee & Malloch, 1933
- Galgupha schutzii (Fabricius, 1781)
- Galgupha singularis McAtee & Malloch
- Galgupha texana McAtee & Malloch, 1933
- Galgupha triconcava McAtee & Malloch
- Galgupha unica McAtee & Malloch
- Galgupha vinculata McAtee & Malloch, 1933
