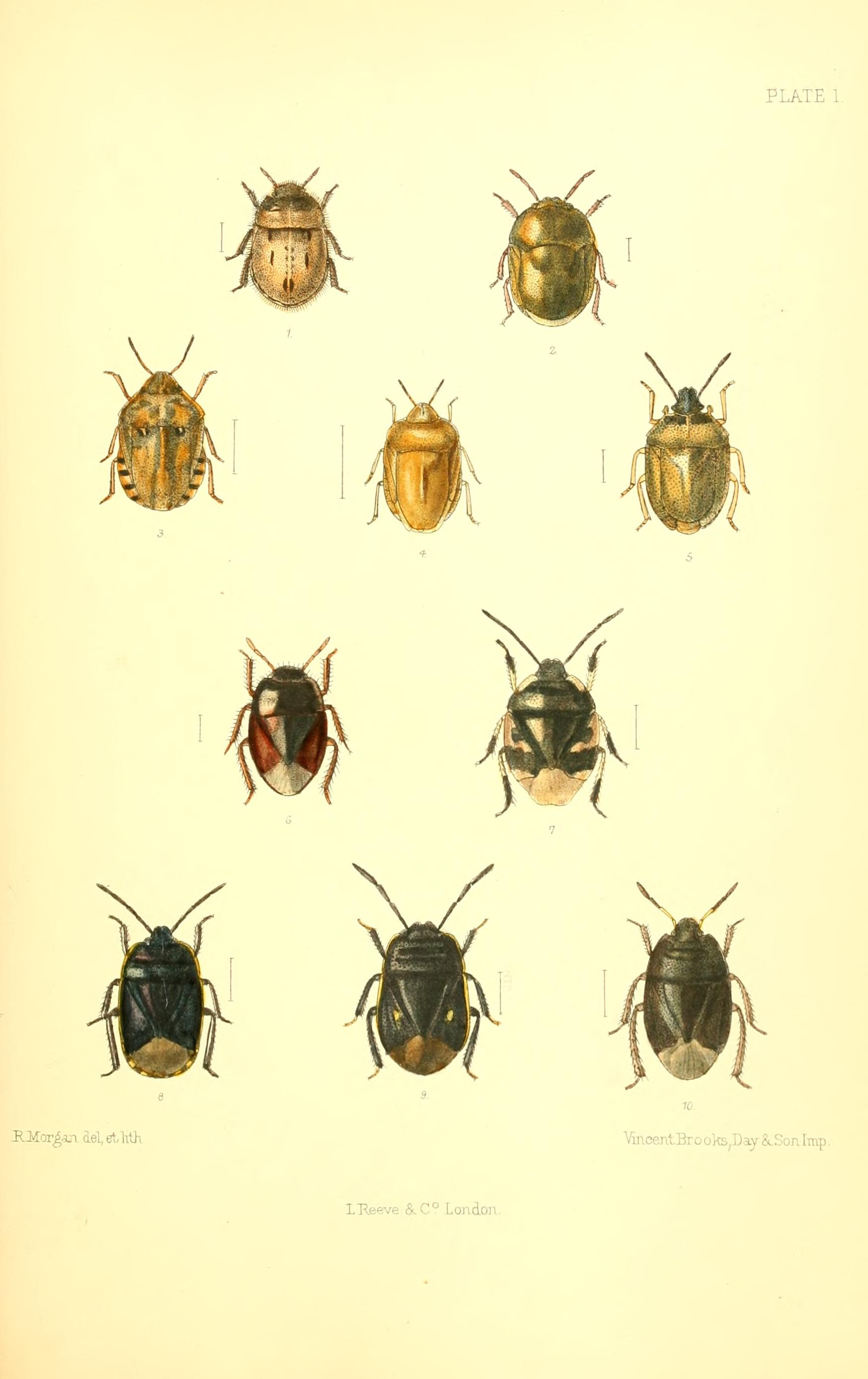

Scientific classification
- Kingdom: Animalia
- Phylum: Arthropoda
- Class: Insecta
- Order: Hemiptera
- Suborder: Heteroptera
- Family: Thyreocoridae
- Subfamily: Thyreocorinae
- Genus: Thyreocoris; Schrank, 1801

= Thyreocoris =

Genus of true bugs

Thyreocoris is an Old World genus of shield bug belonging to the family Thyreocoridae.

The genus was described in 1801 by Franz von Paula Schrank, but most of the historically included species are now classified in other genera, or other families.

== Selected species ==
- Thyreocoris balcanicus Schumacher, 1918
- Thyreocoris fulvipennis (Dallas, 1851)
- Thyreocoris ohridanus Kormilev, 1936
- Thyreocoris scarabaeoides (Linnaeus, 1758)
