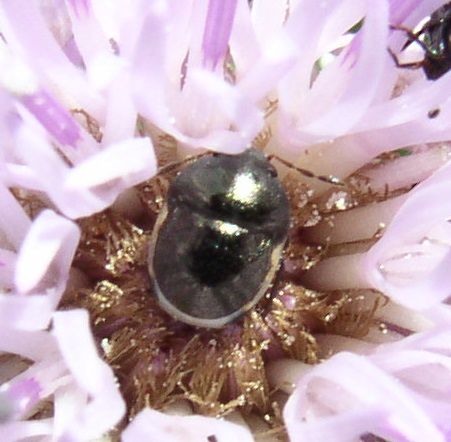

Scientific classification
- Kingdom: Animalia
- Phylum: Arthropoda
- Class: Insecta
- Order: Hemiptera
- Suborder: Heteroptera
- Family: Thyreocoridae
- Genus: Corimelaena
- Species: C. pulicaria

Binomial name
- Corimelaena pulicaria (Germar, 1839)

= Corimelaena pulicaria =

Species of true bug

Corimelaena pulicaria is a species of ebony bug in the family Thyreocoridae. It is found in Central America and North America.
