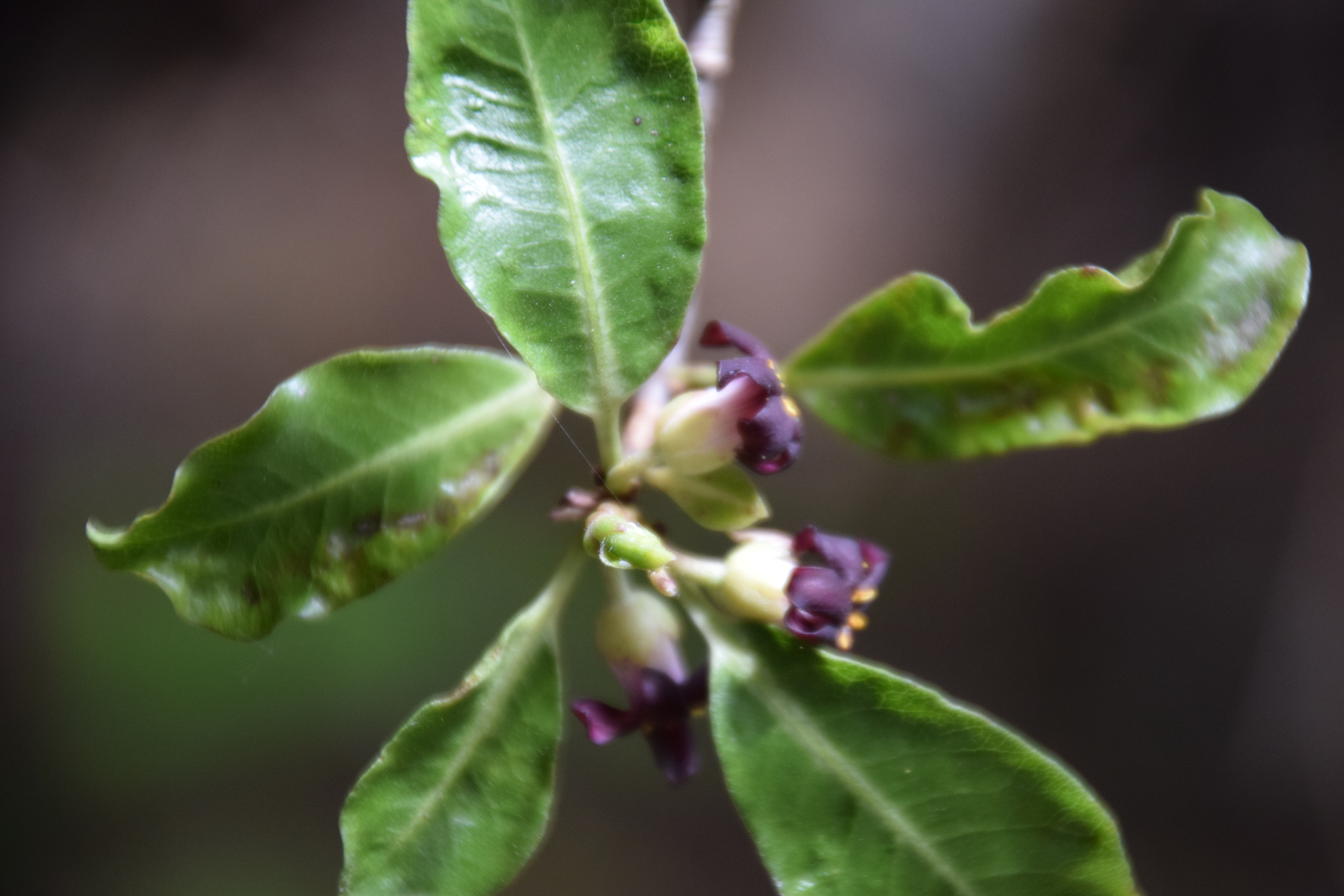

Scientific classification
- Kingdom: Plantae
- Clade: Tracheophytes
- Clade: Angiosperms
- Clade: Eudicots
- Clade: Asterids
- Order: Apiales
- Family: Pittosporaceae
- Genus: Pittosporum
- Species: P. tenuifolium

Binomial name
- Pittosporum tenuifolium Banks & Solander. ex Gaertn., 1788

= Pittosporum tenuifolium =

Species of tree

Pittosporum tenuifolium is a small evergreen tree endemic to New Zealand – growing up to 10 m (33 ft) – commonly known as kōhūhū and black matipo, and by other Māori names kohukohu and tawhiwhi. Its small, very dark, reddish-purple flowers generally go unnoticed, and are scented only at night. The Latin tenuifolium means "slender-leaved".

== Description ==
Pittosporum translates to tarry – pittos – seed – sporum, a reference to the sticky fluid that encases the seeds and tenuifolium means thin – tenui – leaf – folium.

Kōhūhū is a bush or small tree that grows up to around 8–10 metres tall. The trunk is slender (30–40 cm diameter) with a mottled dark grey bark color that progressively turns black towards the tips of the branches.

The leaf coverage is compact in kōhūhū; the leaves are arranged alternately on the stem and the petiole is short. The leaves themselves are usually small – 2–4 cm long by 1–2 cm wide – but can grow up to 7 cm long. The edges are undulated and the leaf shape can range from oval to almost circular. Young leaves are covered in a layer of fine hairs that gets shed as the leaves grow. Adult leaves have a smooth, glossy texture. The colouration of the foliage is a silvery green, darker on the upper side and lighter underneath. The midrib of the leaf and its smaller lateral veins are whiteish and quite visible on the upper side of the leaf.

Kōhūhū has small – around 1 cm in diameter – dark coloured flowers. The colour ranges from dark-red to dark-purple turning almost black as the flowers age. On rare occasions, the colour can be red or yellow. The flowers develop from lateral buds, either individually or in clumps, and can be male or bisexual.

The flowers are filled with nectar and exude a honey scented fragrance in the evenings with the scent being more obvious in slightly damp conditions. This attracts moths and night flying insects, and it is believed these insects help with pollination.

Fertilised flowers develop into small – around 1.2 cm in diameter – globe shaped fruits. The fruit is covered in a small layer of hairs during early maturation that is progressively discarded as the capsule ripens. In the ripening process the capsule shrinks, hardens up and turns almost black, splitting into two or three segments when ripened. Inside are black seeds, encased in a very sticky substance. The stickiness of the seeds is likely to help with seed dispersal.

== Names ==
Common names include:

- Matipo
- Black matipo
- Rautawhiri Rautāwhiri
- Kairaro
- Kihihi
- Kowhiwhi Kōwhiwhi
- Kohukohu
- Koihu
- Māpauriki
- Pōhiri
- Pōwhiri
- Tāwhiri
- Tawiri
- Tawhiwhi
- Silverleaf
- Turpentine-tree
- Black birch

== Distribution ==
=== Natural global range ===
Kōhūhū is endemic to New Zealand.

=== New Zealand range ===
Kōhūhū is well spread all over New Zealand, being absent only to the west of the Southern Alps and Stewart Island.

=== Habitat preferences ===
Kōhūhū is found growing wild in coastal and lower mountain forest areas up to an altitude of 900 m.

Kōhūhū grows particularly quickly at forest edges located at the bottom of high terraces, and can also be found growing in riverbeds. It grows readily in forested areas that have been disturbed or in reverting farmland, playing an important role in ecological succession.

== Life cycle/Phenology ==
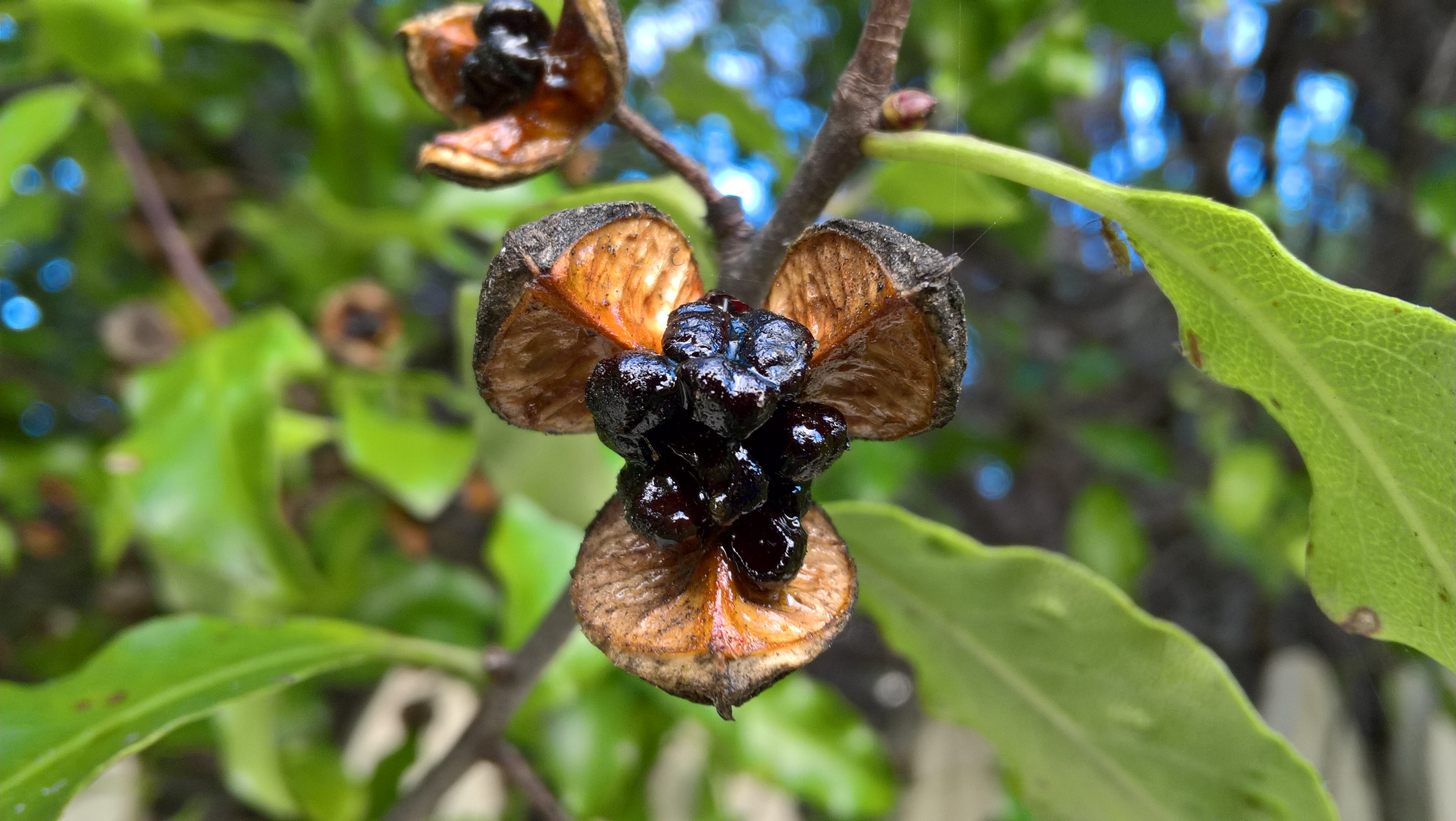
The capsule of kōhūhū, showing the black seeds encased in a sticky substance

Most of the plants in the genus Pittosporum are easily propagated from seed, but germination may be slow. In horticultural production, the sticky substance coating the seeds is removed before sowing, as it acts as a germination inhibitor. The seeds are treated to simulate natural conditions for six weeks in order to improve germination rates.

Kōhūhū is a relatively fast growing plant growing from 0.5 metres to 3 metres within five years. The root system is shallow and spread out. These characteristics make it ideal – when used in conjunction with another plants – for use in stream stabilisation and erosion control.

Flowering happens in late spring, from October to November, and the maturation of the fruit happens between mid-summer and autumn, from January to March.

The seedlings of kōhūhū are unusual, as in some cases they have three or four seed leaves instead of the usual two.

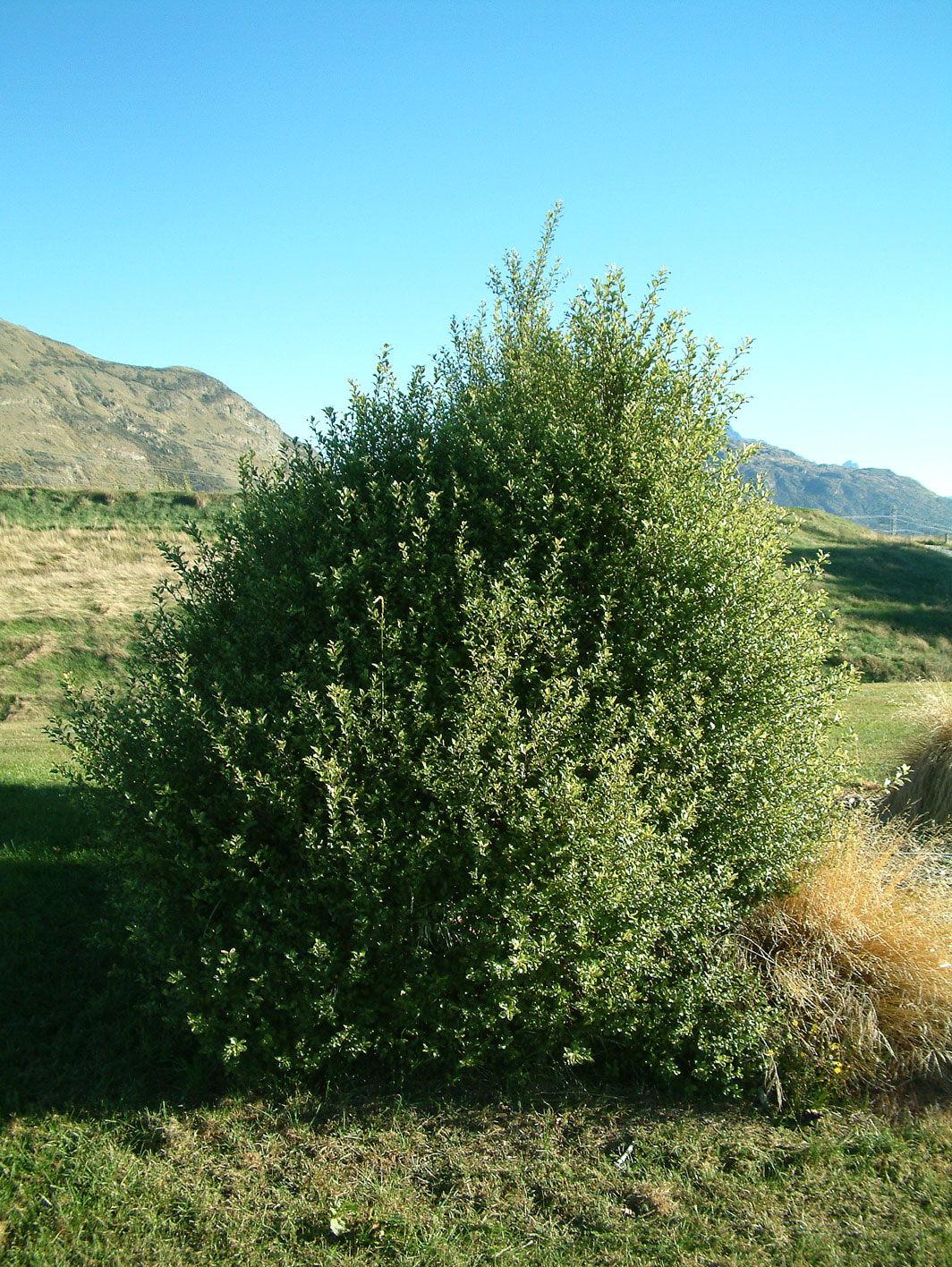
Medium-sized kōhūhū tree in Queenstown, New Zealand

== Diet and foraging ==
Kōhūhū is a hardy plant that can cope with poor conditions – poor soils, droughts and windy environments. It is, however, a light-demanding plant and prefers soils with good drainage in humid climates. Planting it in damp conditions can cause winter leaf drop, which likely explains why kōhūhū is not found growing on the West Coast of New Zealand. In its role in ecological succession, kōhūhū is often found at an earlier stage than its relative lemonwood (another endemic Pittosporum), and usually inhabits less fertile soils.

== Predators, Parasites, and Diseases ==
=== Insects ===
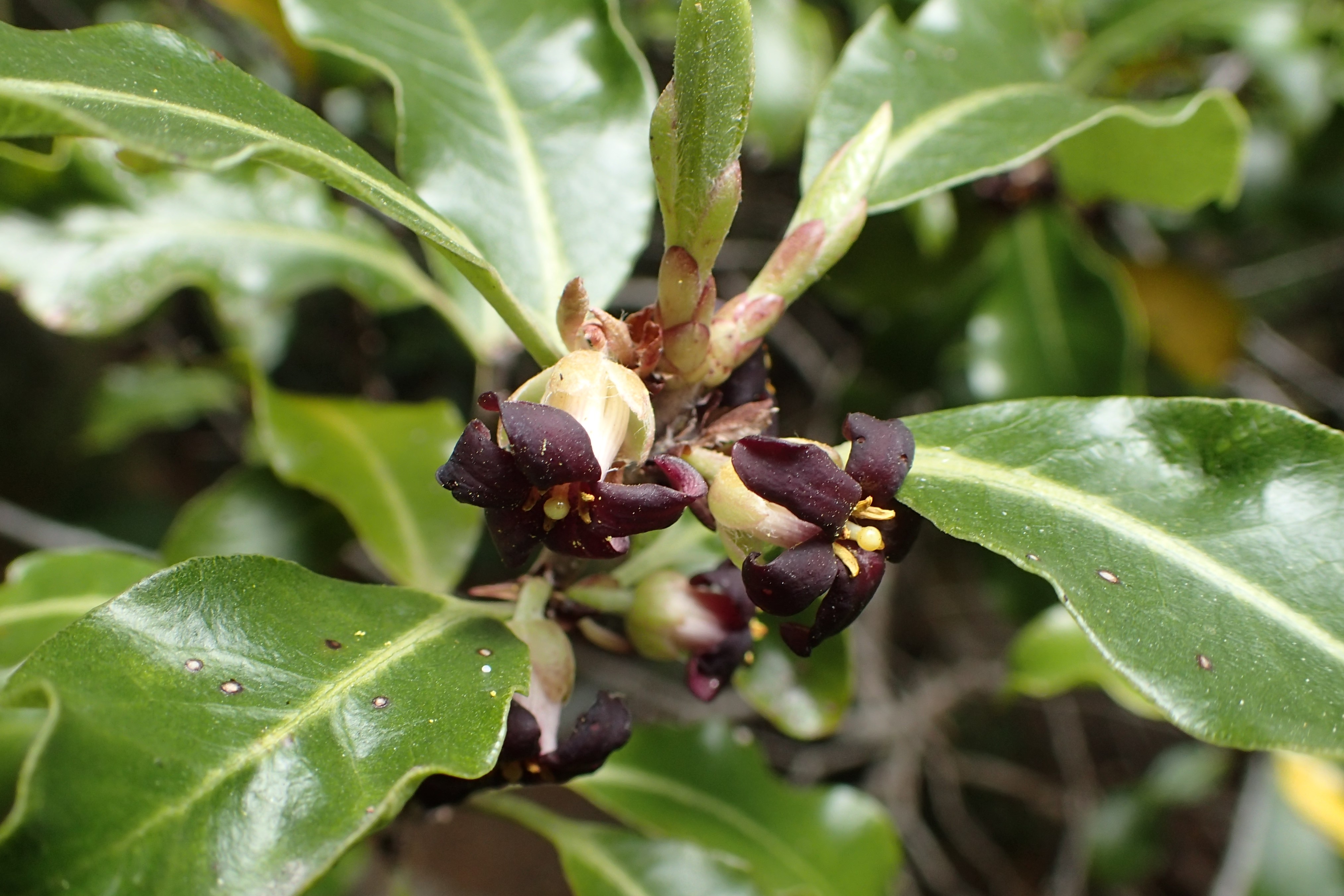
The small, dark flower of kōhūhū

There are over 50 insect species listed in the Plant-SyNZ database that either feed on or parasitise kōhūhū, including wasps, sucking bugs, flies, moths, butterflies, thrips, mites and beetles. There are also more than a dozen beetles that feed on the dead plant material.

Below are some species of interest, organised by feeding habits:

Pittosporum flower weevil (Aneuma rubricale), a native insect, lays its eggs on the flower of kōhūhū; interestingly, only kōhūhū is chosen for this, even if the weevil feeds on other types of Pittosporum. As soon as the weevil's larvae hatch, they start feeding on the stamens and ovaries of the flowers, switching to the leaves once they reach adulthood.

An arrival from Australia, pittosporum shield bug (Monteithiella humeralis) as well as the endemic pittosporum psyllid Trioza vitreoradiata feed only on Pittosporum species, by attaching themselves to a suitable part of the plant and feeding on its sap. The psyllid leaves a trail of characteristic "beads" behind.

Cottony cushion scale (Icerya purchasi), an Australian bug, soft wax scale (Ceroplastes destructor), an import from overseas and the Australian green shield bug (Glaucias amyoti), native to New Zealand despite its name also parasitise the Pittosporum species, but have a more varied range of hosts. All attach themselves to a suitable part of the plant and feed on its sap.

New Zealand flower thrips (Thrips obscuratus) feeds on leaves, flowers and young fruit of kōhūhū, by piercing plant cells and sucking their contents.

=== Fungi ===
Pythium irregulare has been recorded as a pathogen of kōhūhū, causing foliar blight, rot, and eventually death.

A recently discovered pathogen of kōhūhū that caused swelling of twigs, the fungus Elsinoe takoropuku, turned out to be a newly discovered species of fungi. The fungus was, so far, only found in association with kōhūhū.

== Uses ==
=== Garden plant ===
Kōhūhū is a popular garden plant in New Zealand and overseas, often used a hedge or as visual backdrop. It is sometimes grown under the cultivar name 'Nigricans', so called because of its black stems. In horticulture it is valued for its coloured foliage (cultivated variations include purple, "silver" and variegated leaves), and for its tolerance of some horticulturally difficult growing conditions, including dry soils and shade (although in northwest Europe, cold and exposed situations do not suit it).

Several hybrids and cultivars have been developed and five varieties won the Royal Horticultural Society's Award of Garden Merit due to their ability to cope in the growing conditions of the United Kingdom:

- 'Arundel Green'
- 'Garnettii'
- 'Irene Paterson'
- 'Silver Queen'
- 'Tom Thumb'
- 'Warnham Gold'

=== Host of threatened wood rose ===
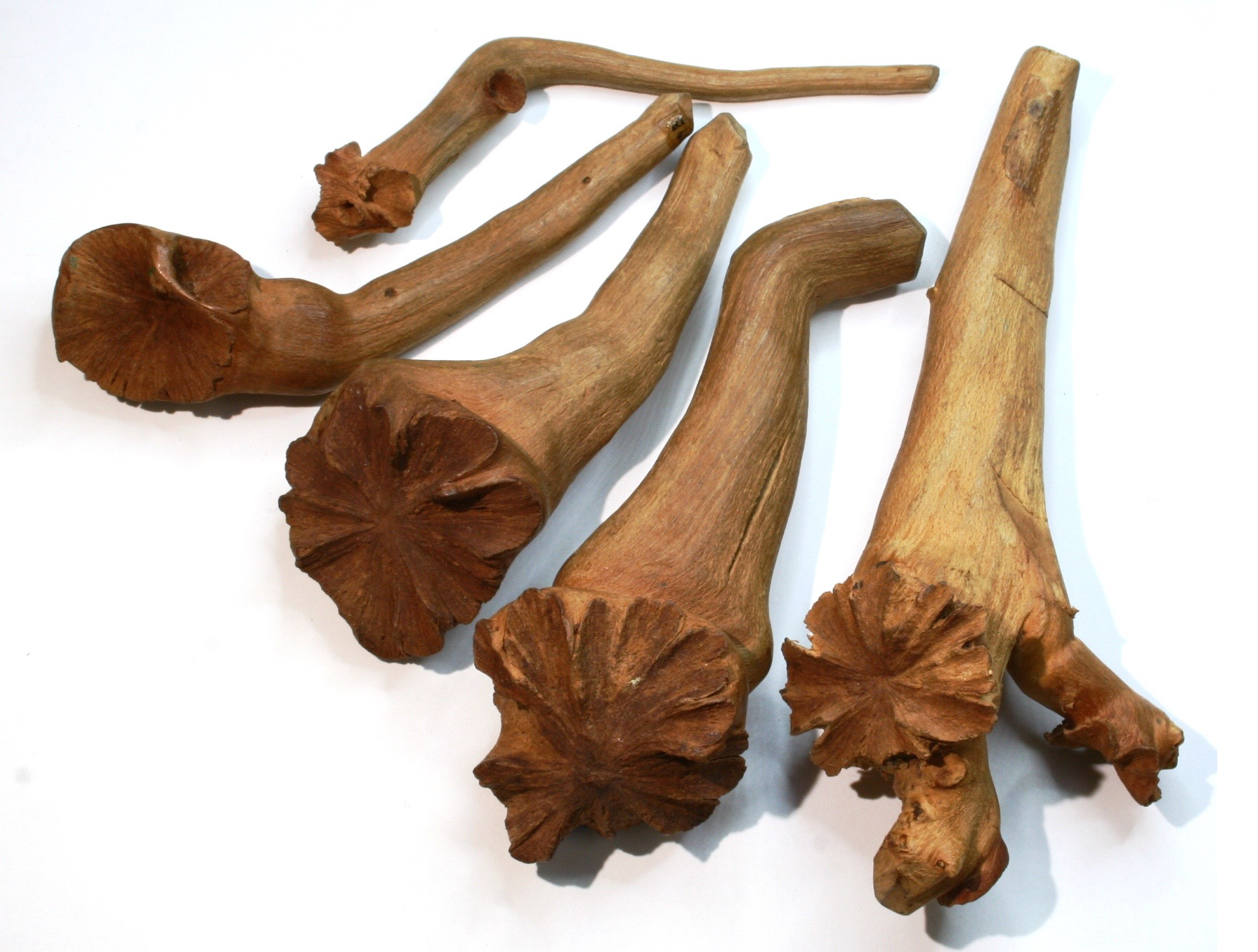
The structure formed by the threatened root parasite wood rose

Kōhūhū has the potential to be used as the host of the threatened root parasite plant wood rose (Dactylanthus taylorii). Wood rose was recently successfully translocated and sown in the wild from seed, showing the largest success rate when planted in association with kōhūhū.

=== Use by Māori ===
There are several recorded uses of kōhūhū by Māori. The resin and oils extracted from the leaves have been used for their scent and often mixed with ingredients sourced from other native trees in order to produce an oil of variable composition. The resin is obtained by making cuts in the bark of the tree and the leaves crushed and mixed with other oils. The oil is used to scent little pouches or a dead bird skin, often worn around the neck. The oil is also used to scent houses and mats of people of high rank.

In addition, kōhūhū has been used for medicinal purposes by Māori. The resin has been mixed with other gums and chewed as a cure for bad breath and sores in the mouth. Parts of the plants have been used as topical treatment for relief of the symptoms of skin diseases. Crushed leaves also have been used as a poultice for ulcers. The crushed bark has been soaked in water and the resulting mixture used to treat breast or chest ailments, and the remaining liquid taken orally. It has been used, together with flax root, to make a brew used to treat fever, bleeding and bruising. Validating its traditional uses as a medicine, a 2010 study indicated that kōhūhū does indeed possess some antimicrobial properties.

The branches of kōhūhū have been used in Māori life ceremonies, such as baptisms, and for welcoming visitors to a marae. Two of its common names, tāwhiri ("to wave to") and rautāwhiri ("to wave a leaf") reflect this.
