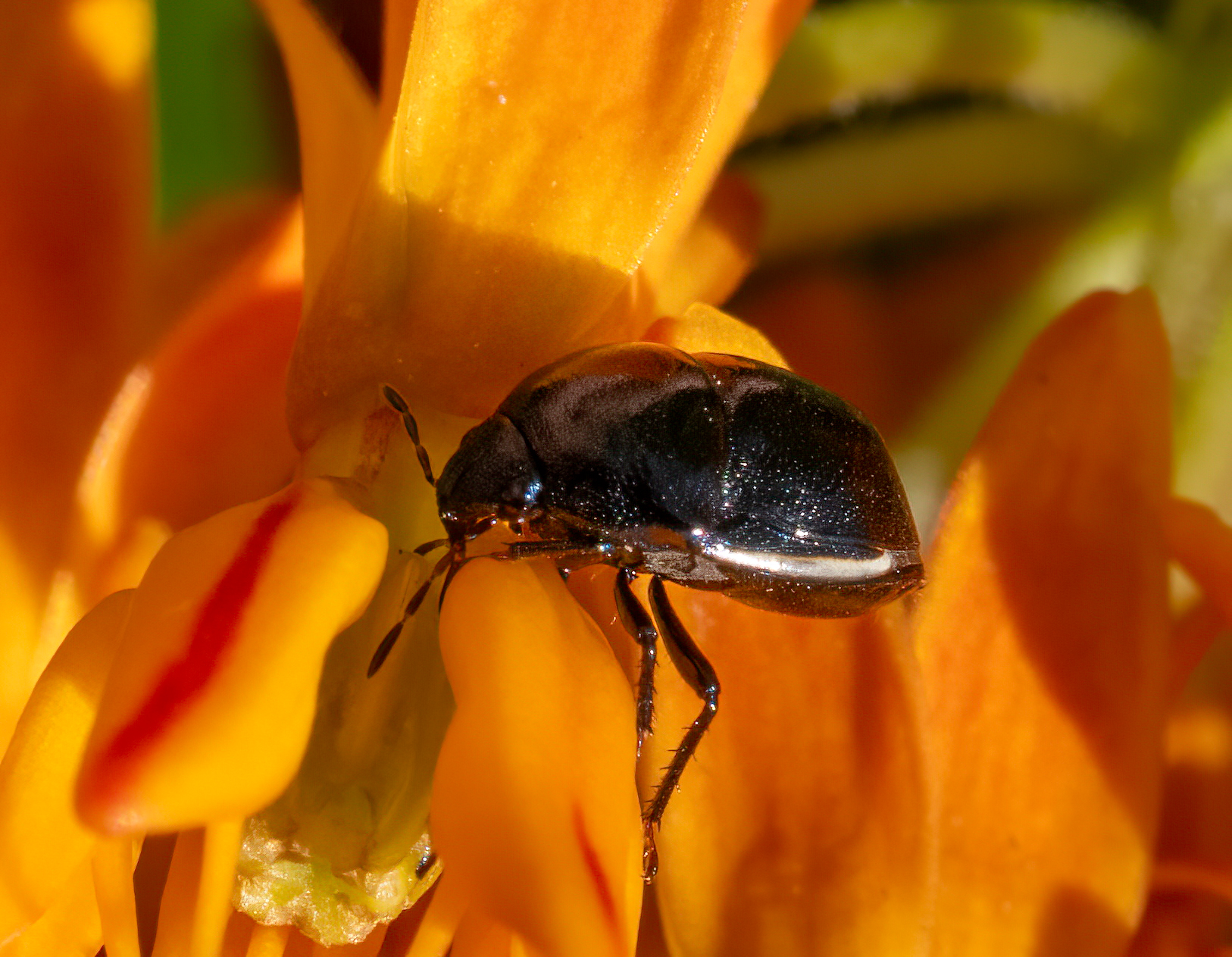

Scientific classification
- Kingdom: Animalia
- Phylum: Arthropoda
- Class: Insecta
- Order: Hemiptera
- Suborder: Heteroptera
- Family: Thyreocoridae
- Genus: Corimelaena; White, 1839

Synonyms
- Eucoria Mulsant and Rey, 1865

= Corimelaena =

Genus of true bugs

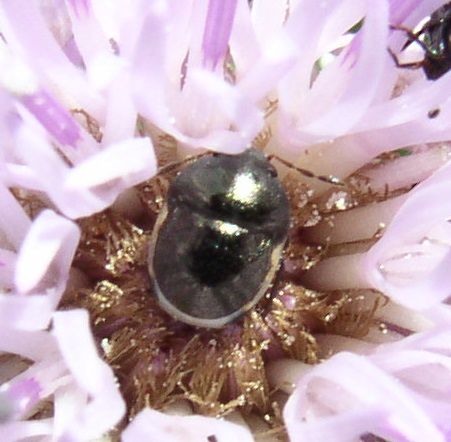
Corimelaena pulicaria

Corimelaena is a genus of bugs in the family Thyreocoridae. There are at least 20 described species in Corimelaena.

== Species ==
These 20 species belong to the genus Corimelaena:

- Corimelaena agrella Mcatee, 1919^{i c g b}
- Corimelaena alpina (McAtee and Malloch, 1933)^{i c g}
- Corimelaena barberi (McAtee and Malloch, 1933)^{i c g}
- Corimelaena californica Van Duzee, 1929^{i c g}
- Corimelaena cognata (Van Duzee, 1907)^{i c g}
- Corimelaena contrasta (McAtee and Malloch, 1933)^{i c g}
- Corimelaena extensa Uhler, 1863^{i c g}
- Corimelaena feminea (McAtee and Malloch, 1933)^{i c g}
- Corimelaena harti Malloch, 1919^{i c g}
- Corimelaena incognita (Mcatee & Malloch, 1933)^{i c g b}
- Corimelaena interrupta Malloch, 1919^{i c g}
- Corimelaena lateralis (Fabricius, 1803)^{i c g b}
- Corimelaena marginella Dallas, 1851^{i c g}
- Corimelaena minuta Uhler, 1863^{i c g}
- Corimelaena minutissima Malloch, 1919^{i c g}
- Corimelaena nigra Dallas, 1851^{i c g}
- Corimelaena obscura Mcpherson & Sailer, 1978^{i c g b}
- Corimelaena polita Malloch, 1919^{i c g}
- Corimelaena pulicaria (Germar, 1839)^{i c g b}
- Corimelaena virilis (McAtee and Malloch, 1933)^{i c g}

Data sources: i = ITIS, c = Catalogue of Life, g = GBIF, b = Bugguide.net
