= Cydnoides =

Scientific classification
- Kingdom: Animalia
- Phylum: Arthropoda
- Class: Insecta
- Order: Hemiptera
- Suborder: Heteroptera
- Family: Thyreocoridae
- Genus: Cydnoides; Malloch, 1919

Genus of true bugs

Cydnoides is a genus of bugs in the family Thyreocoridae. There are about five described species in Cydnoides.

== Species ==
These five species belong to the genus Cydnoides:

- Cydnoides albipennis (Say, 1859)
- Cydnoides ciliatus (Uhler, 1863)
- Cydnoides confusus McAtee and Malloch, 1933
- Cydnoides obtusus (Uhler, 1894)
- Cydnoides renormatus (Uhler, 1895)
