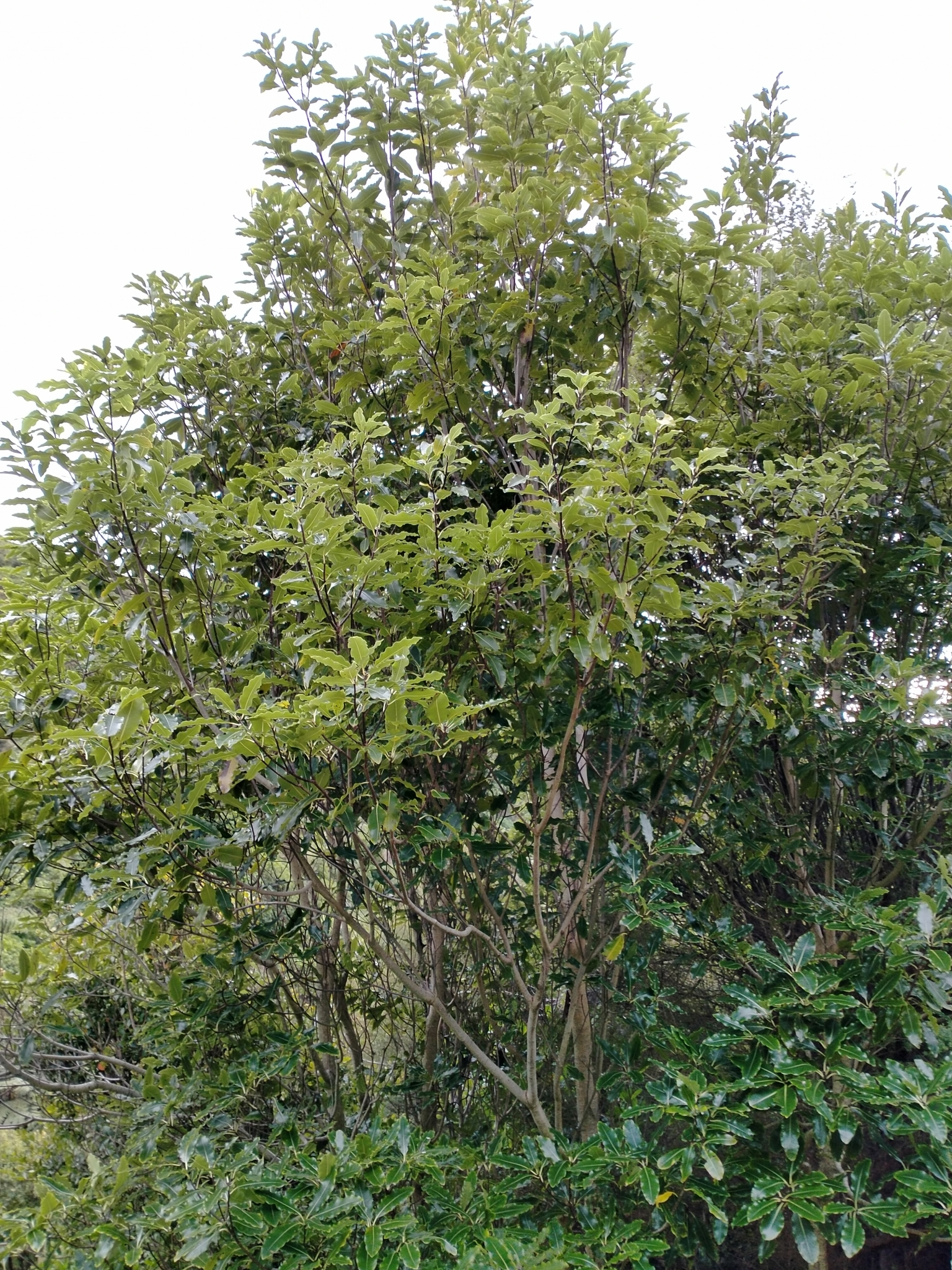
- Pittosporum eugenioides in Island Bay, Wellington

Scientific classification
- Kingdom: Plantae
- Clade: Tracheophytes
- Clade: Angiosperms
- Clade: Eudicots
- Clade: Asterids
- Order: Apiales
- Family: Pittosporaceae
- Genus: Pittosporum
- Species: P. eugenioides

Binomial name
- Pittosporum eugenioides A.Cunn., 1840

= Pittosporum eugenioides =

Species of tree

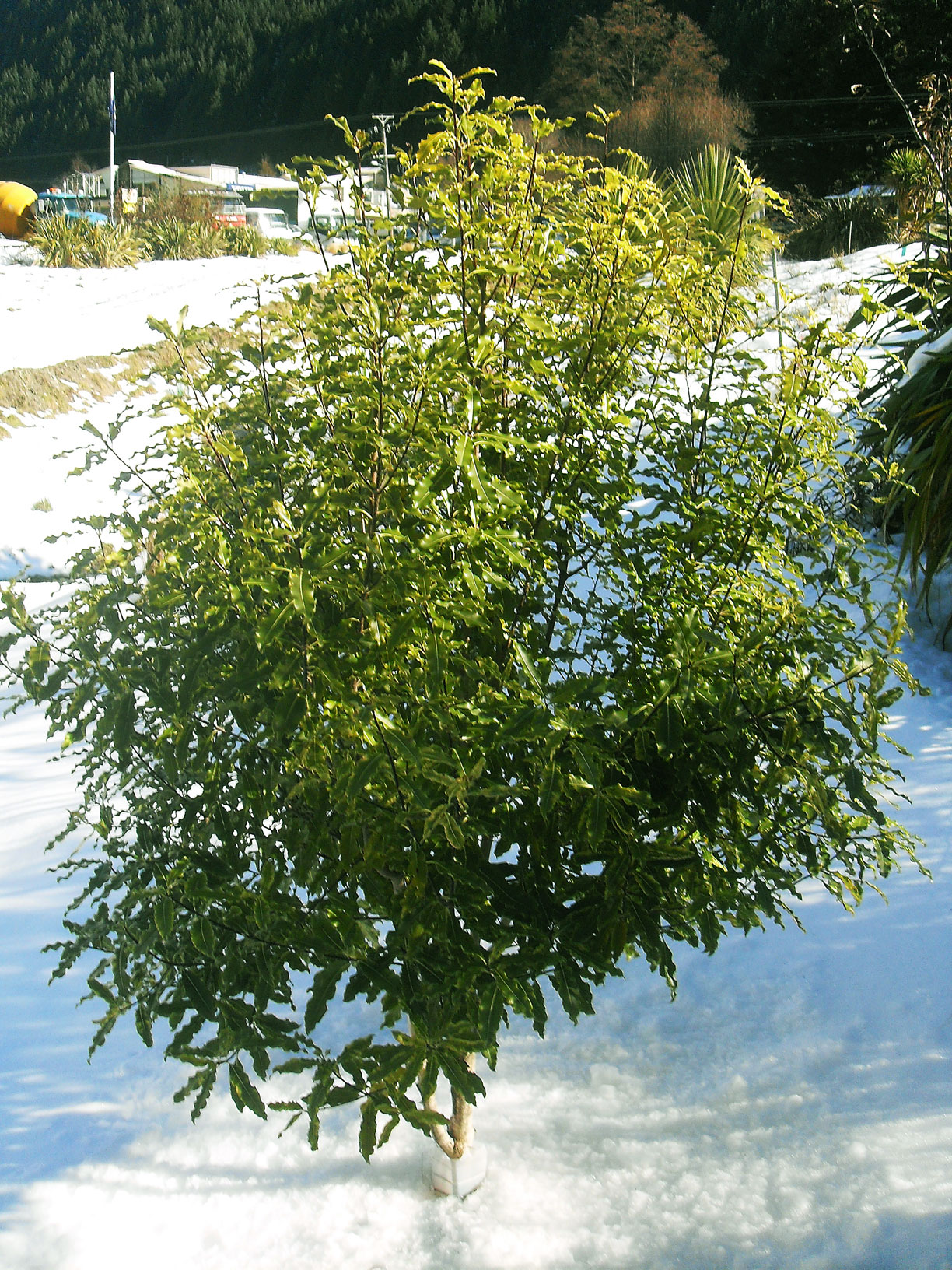
Lemonwood in snow

Pittosporum eugenioides, commonly known as tarata or lemonwood, is a species of evergreen tree endemic to New Zealand. Growing to 12 m (39 ft) tall by 5 m (16 ft) broad, it is conical when young but more rounded in shape when mature. Its leaves are mottled yellow-green with curly edges and a salient bright midrib, and have a strong lemony smell when crushed. It has highly fragrant clusters of attractive yellow-cream flowers in spring, followed by distinctive black seed capsules. It is found throughout New Zealand's North and South Islands along forest margins and stream banks from sea level to 600 m (1,969 ft). It is New Zealand's largest Pittosporum.

The binomial qualifier eugenioides means "resembling Eugenia", a different genus of plants.

The variegated cultivar 'Variegatum' has gained the Royal Horticultural Society's Award of Garden Merit.

== Life cycle/phenology ==
Pittosporum eugenioides starts out as a small compact tree; as it matures it becomes a tall branched tree. It flowers between October and December. The following year, after flowering, the capsules will open. The capsules open the next year because the fruit of the lemonwood takes between 12 and 14 months to ripen. There is unripe fruit and ripe fruit present on the lemonwood at the same time; this is the current season's fruit and last season's fruit. Lemonwood is pollinated by both insects and birds, with the seeds being dispersed by birds. The seeds of the lemonwood germinate quickly and will become seedlings within a month.

== Range ==
Pittosporum eugenioides is endemic to New Zealand. There are "about 200 trees and shrubs" in the genus located in neighbouring parts of the world. Places where the genus is found include Africa, Australia, some Pacific islands, southern and eastern Asia, and New Zealand. A reason for this endemic occurrence is due to the isolation of New Zealand over a long period of time.

=== New Zealand range ===
Pittosporum eugenioides is found throughout the South Island and North Island in low lying forests. It is found in forest clearings and along forest margins up to 600 m above sea level.

=== Habitat preferences ===
Pittosporum eugenioides can be found in a cooler, mature, lowland and subalpine forest climate zone throughout New Zealand. The species can be found in regenerating areas of forest, both young and old. It has proved to be a great plant for establishing a quick canopy.

This species, along with other Pittosporum, are making their way in to the average household gardens. Nurseries and garden centres are stocking this native because it is suited to New Zealand conditions where it naturally grew many years ago.

At home in the garden, P. eugenioides prefers a sunny to part shade position, does not mind the wind, and thrives in soil with good drainage.

== Cultivation ==
The viability of tarata's seeds is affected by moisture levels of the soil. If the moisture levels are too high the seed is likely to become unviable. Like other pittospora, tarata is somewhat drought resistant. P. eugenioides is relatively simple to look after in a domestic setting. It grows well, thriving off regular watering intervals during summer. It enjoys a feed with general tree and shrub fertiliser twice a year during spring and summer while it is growing. Responds well to pruning also, which will assure survival in the forest too if disturbed.

== Ecology ==
The pittosporum flower weevil (Aneuma rubricale) is a parasite that feeds on the underside of the lemonwood leaves. This parasite does not kill the lemonwood; it just damages the leaves through its feeding. The holes the weevils eat in the leaves are visible because the leaf reacts causing a dark brownish purple ring to form around the hole. Pittosporum eugenioides is only a host to the adult weevil as the larvae are only known to be hosted on Pittosporum tenuifolium. Common garden pests can cover this plant, such as aphids and blister scale (Psyilids). Both can easily be controlled and treated with an insecticide. The best time to spray as a preventative is February, then again in October.

== Citrus aroma ==
The sweet scent of the flowers suggest nectar-loving birds find this an ideal plant to forage from. An experiment was carried out to see if the citrus-like chemicals were the same ones that are present in lemon-like species, such as Verbena varieties. The lemony leaves are a unique combination of scented chemicals found in the oil produced. Octyl acetate, Terpinen-4-ol and Decanol were found in a test that was carried out. Octyl acetate is responsible for the "fruity, Jasmine, herbaceous aroma". Terpinen-4-ol scent is "somewhere between peppermint and pine". Finally, Decanol is a "fatty, orange blossom odor". Results of this test unearthed that this lemonwood aroma combination is very unusual for this genus and the chemicals are different to those found in other citrus-scented species.

== Traditional uses ==
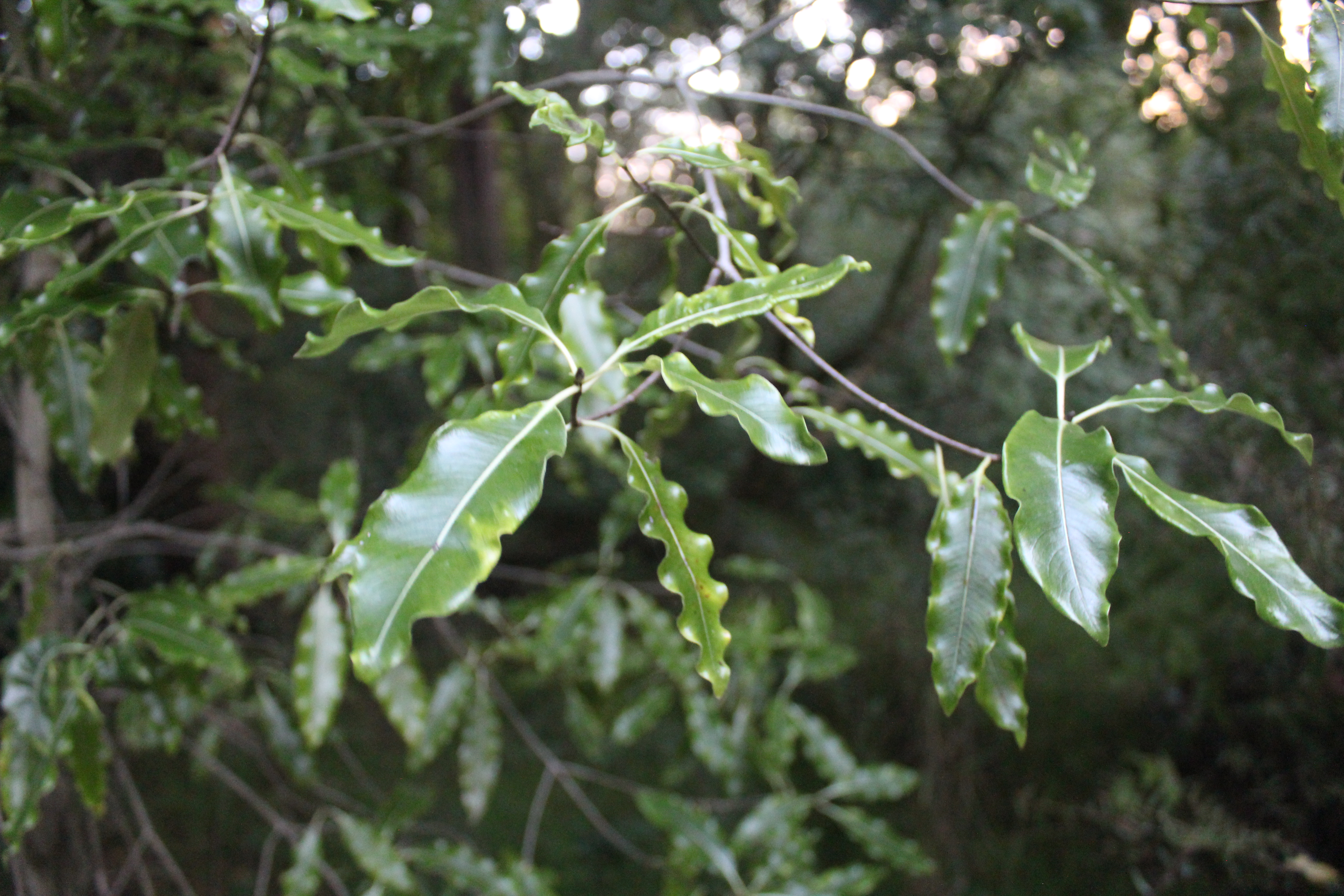
Leaves of the Pittosporum eugenioides

=== Cultural uses ===
Māori traditionally used the gum and crushed leaves and flowers of the tarata for scent, usually mixed with plant oils such as tītoki and kōhia. Māori also used the lemonwood to make hair oils and perfume. For perfume, the oil was mixed with bird fat. The gum from the tree was used for bad breath. They rolled the gum in to a ball and this was thought to last a whole generation. When chewed, the gum was used as a glue.

=== Restoration planting ===
P. eugenioides is effective at establishing a shade canopy in a restoration setting. It is fast growing, and quickly provides an opportunity to introduce understory, shade-loving plants underneath. It is recommended to plant this species closer than in an established forest since this may imitate the growth of the seedlings on the forest floor. This results in plants tending to grow upward more rapidly.

Lemonwood is on the recommended list for replanting "small trees up to 6m" naturally occurring species in to the design guidelines of the Christchurch City Council. "Hardy native species offer a great number of benefits" and are more flexible to suit local conditions compared to "foreign" plant selection.

=== Home garden design ===
In domestic settings, tarata is often planted as a hedging or screening plant. Since it drops few leaves, it is convenient near swimming pools. It is wind tolerant and can provide shelter for nearby plants.
