= Charles Jean-Baptiste Amyot =

French lawyer and entomologist

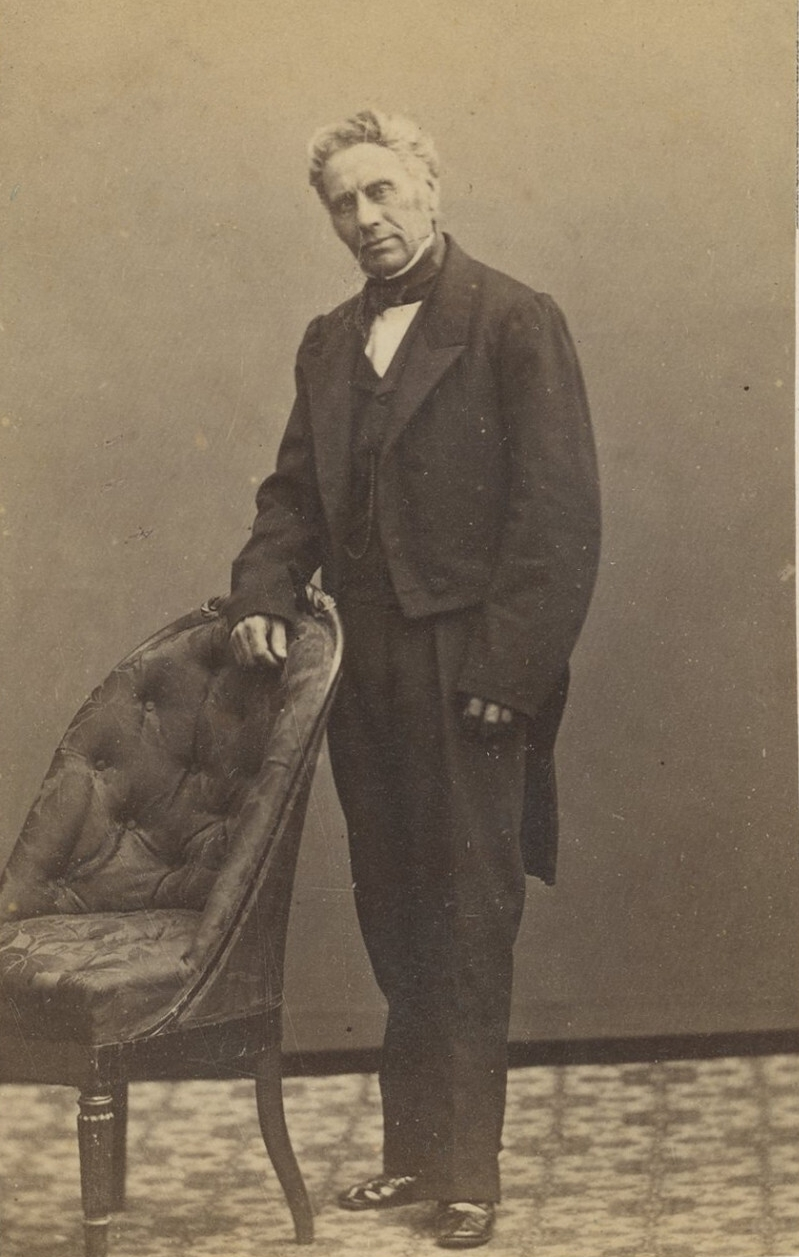
Amyot from a carte-de-viste, c. 1865

Charles Jean-Baptiste Amyot (French: [ʃaʁl ʒɑ̃batist amjo]; 23 September 1799, in Vendreeuv – 13 October 1866, in Paris) was a French lawyer and entomologist especially interested in the Hemiptera.

After his father died, Amyot lived with a neighbor, a wealthy merchant, who was also an entomologist, Jean Guillaume Audinet-Serville. They become life-long friends, and Audinet-Serville advised Amyot to specialize in the Hemiptera, which at the time was being ignored by serious entomologists.

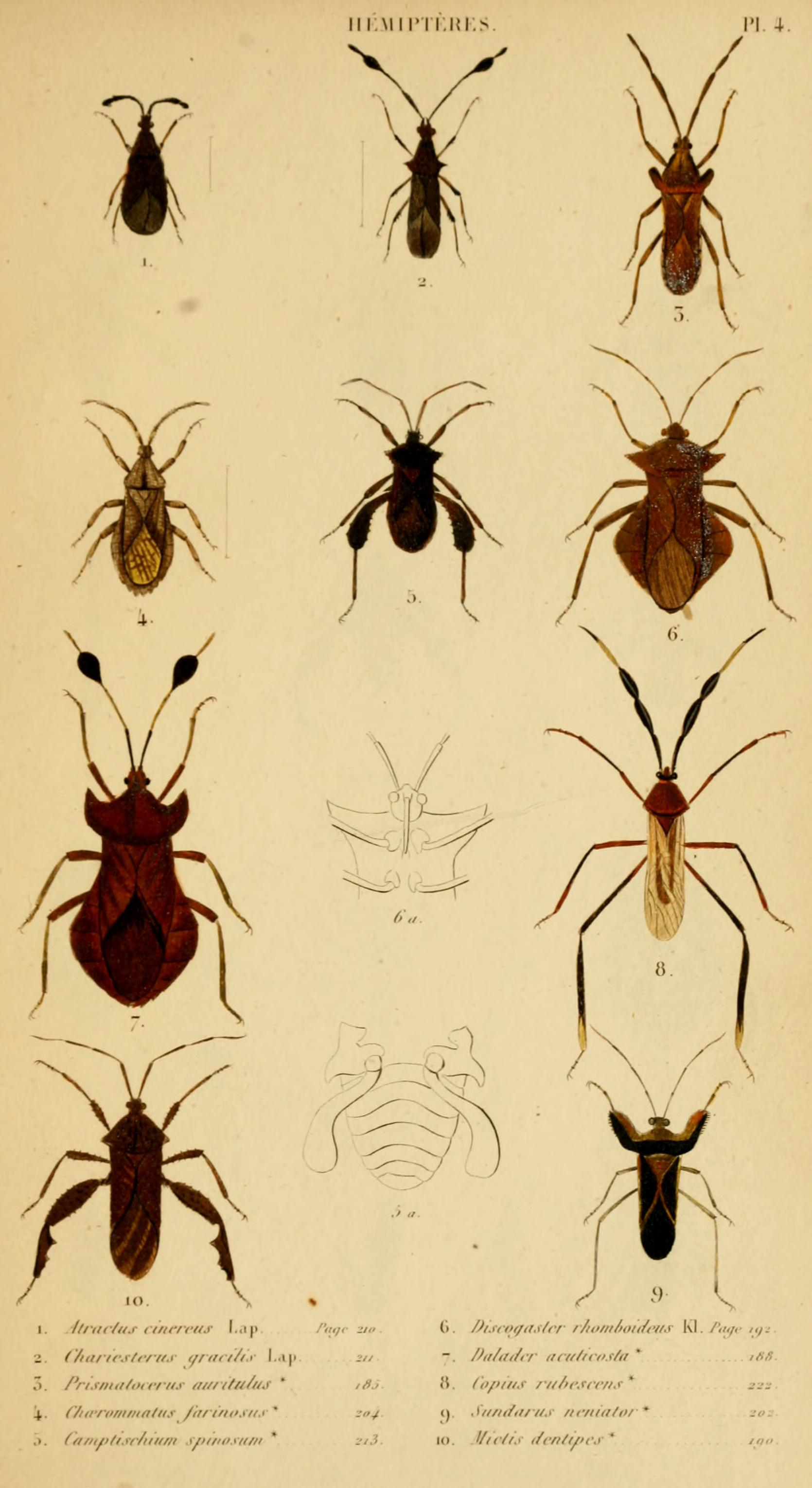
Histoire Naturelle des Insectes.Hémiptères.Plate4

In 1822, Amyot became a lawyer, but he continued to study the Hemiptera. In 1833, he published a work on civil law, Institutes, ou Principes des lois civiles (Institutes, or the principles of civil law). In 1843, together with Audinet-Serville, he published Histoire naturelle des insectes hémiptères (The Natural History of the Hemiptera Insects). Amyot was also interested in applied entomology and wrote several publications devoted to insect pests and how to fight them.

Amyot later became the president of the Entomological Society of France (Société entomologique de France), where he argued for his monomial nomenclature (see binomial nomenclature) for classification purposes, to the point where his fellow members withheld the honorary membership usually awarded to past presidents.

== Works ==
- Entomologie Francaise. Rhynchotes. Méthode mononymique, in Annales de la Société Entomologique de France (2): 1845, T.3: 369-492; 1846, T.4: 73-192; 359-452; 1847, T.5:143-238; 453-524 (1845-1847).
- Entomologie Francaise. Rhynchotes. Méthode mononymique. Paris, J.-B. Baillière, Libraire de l'Acad. Roy. Méd.: 1-504, 5 pl.(1848).
- with Audinet-Serville.Histoire naturelle des insectes Hémiptères. Paris, Libraire Encyclopédique de Roret: 1-675 (1843) BDHL Scan .

== Legacy ==
- In 1851 William Sweetland Dallas named the species Rhaphigaster amyoti in Amyot's honor. It is now known as Glaucias amyoti.

== Sources ==
- Lhoste, Jean (1987) Les Entomologistes Francais 1750 - 1950'' (The French entomologists from 1750 to 1950). INRA, OPIE (Entomology): 115 [A1036].
