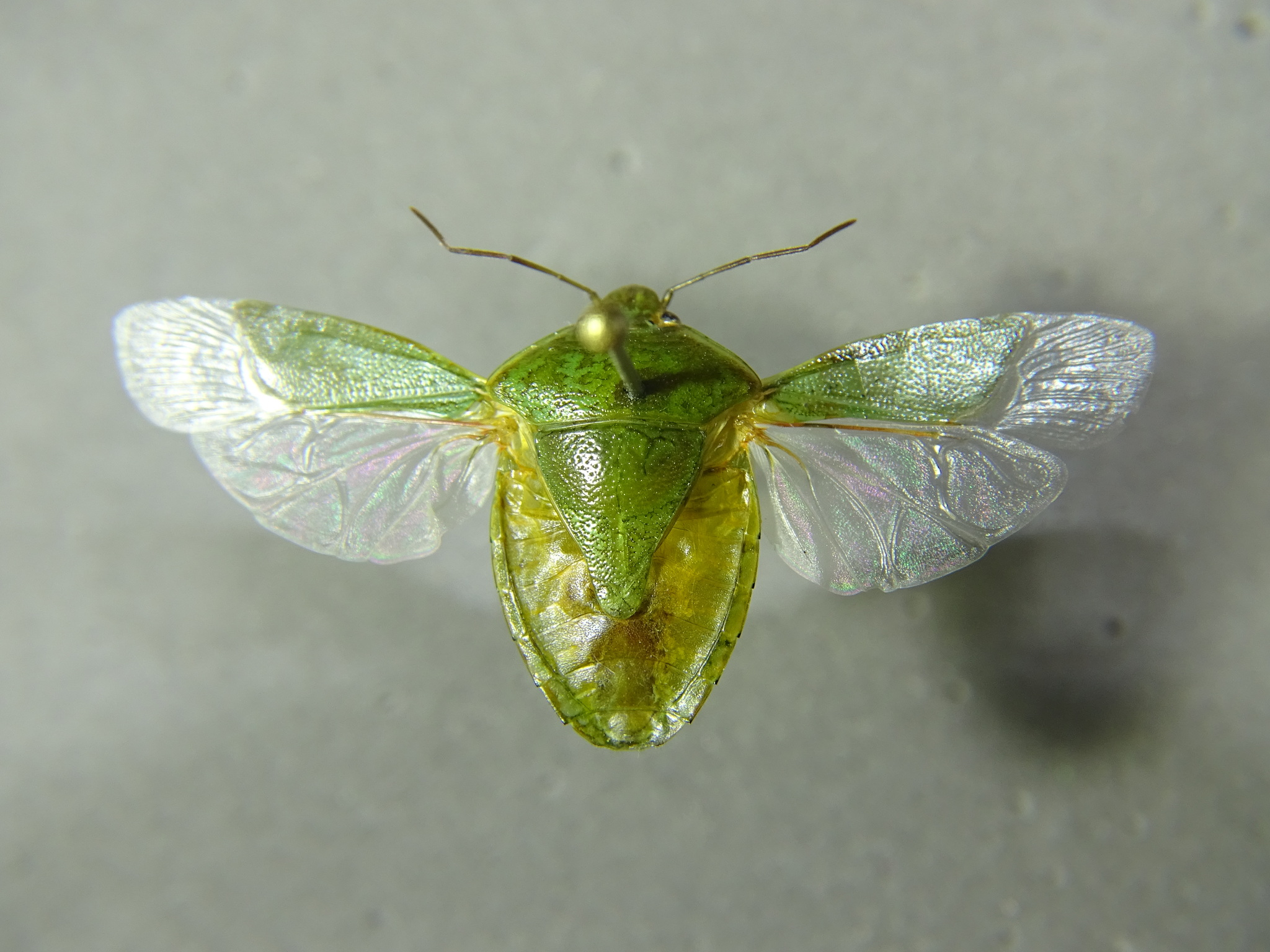

Scientific classification
- Kingdom: Animalia
- Phylum: Arthropoda
- Class: Insecta
- Order: Hemiptera
- Suborder: Heteroptera
- Family: Pentatomidae
- Genus: Glaucias
- Species: G. amyoti

Binomial name
- Glaucias amyoti (Dallas, 1851)

Synonyms
- Rhaphigaster amyoti Dallas, 1851; Zangis stali Schouteden, 1906

= Glaucias amyoti =

Species of true bug

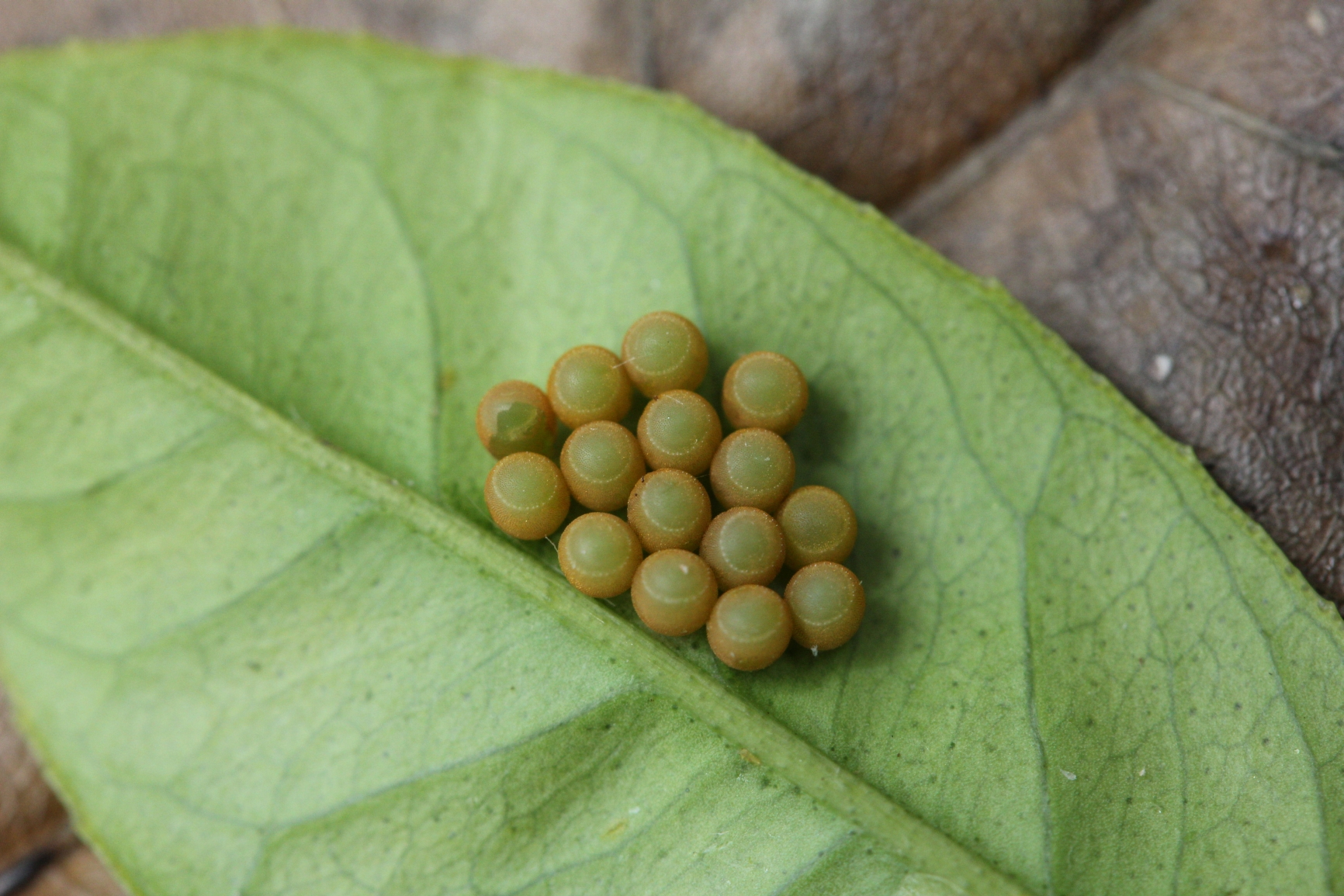
Glaucias amyoti egg capsules on the underside of a lemon (Citrus limon) leaf

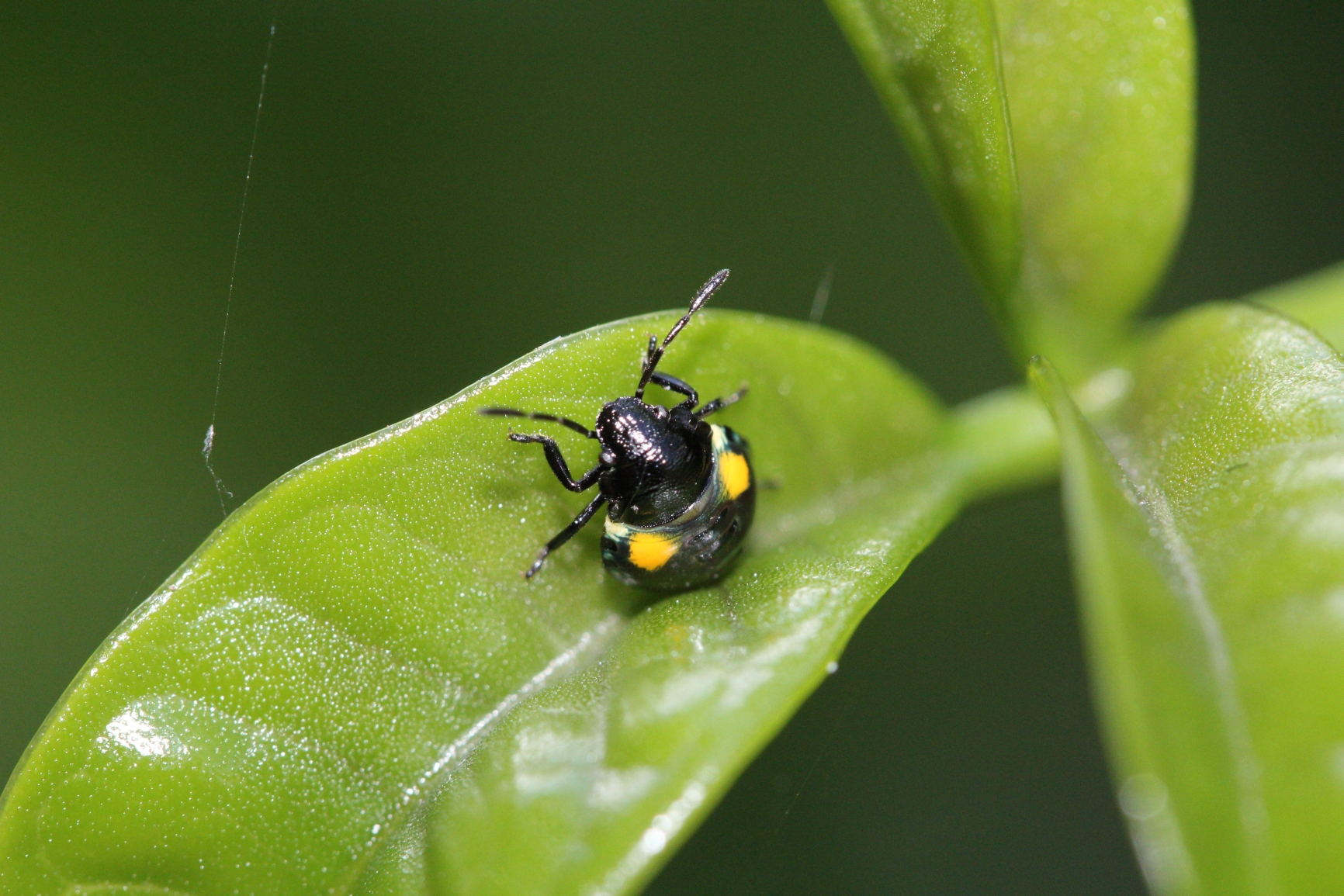
Glaucias amyoti second instar on a leaf of Three Kings Vine (Tecomanthe speciosa)

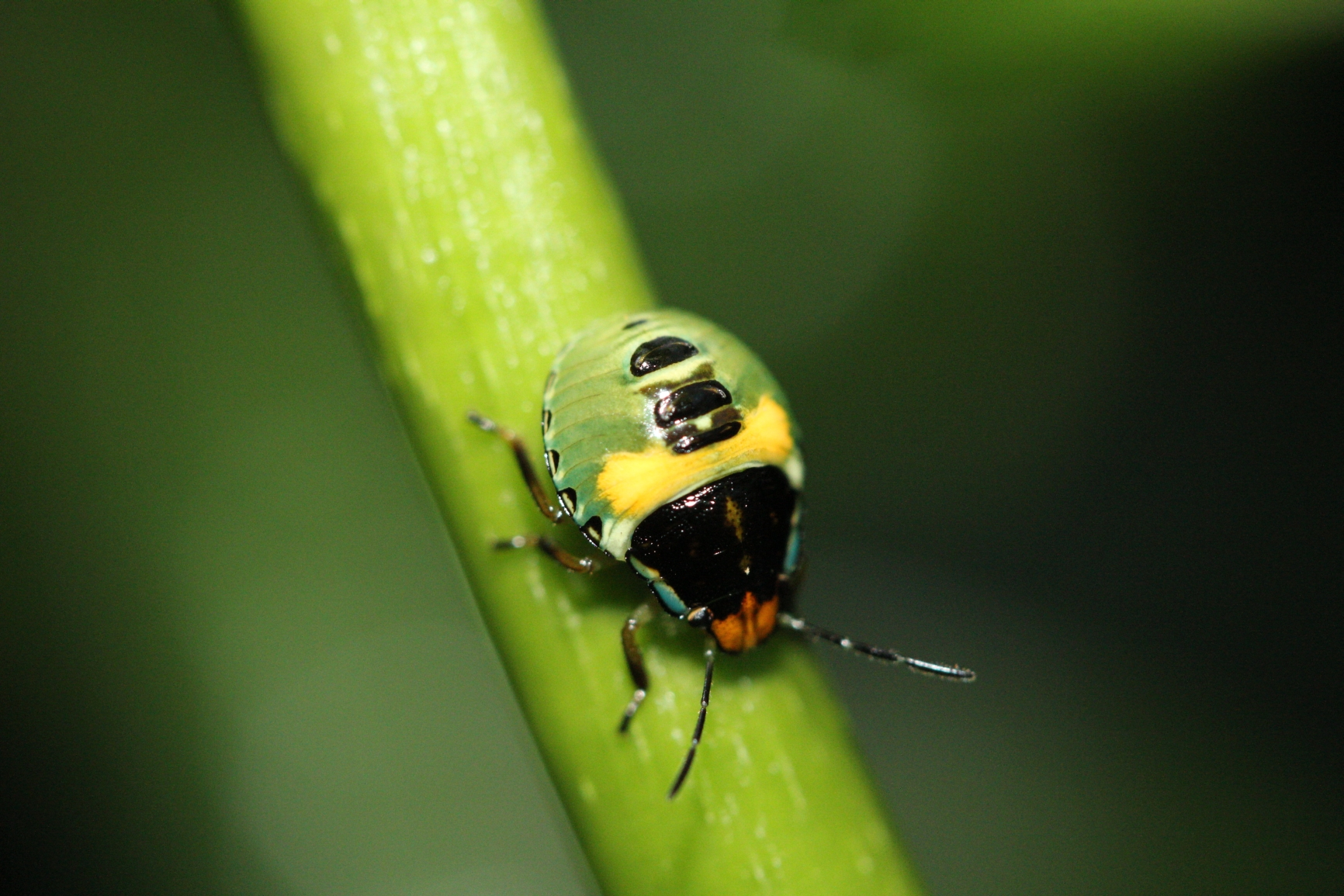
Glaucias amyoti third instar on a runner of Three Kings Vine (Tecomanthe speciosa)

Glaucias amyoti, commonly called the Australasian green shield bug or New Zealand vegetable bug, is a species of shield bug found in Australia, New Zealand, Timor, and New Guinea.

Adults and juveniles feed off plants including certain Coprosma, Griselinia and Myoporum species.

== Description ==
According to the original description, adults of G. amyoti are ovate in shape and green in colour. The dorsal surface is densely punctate, while the ventral surface is paler and very finely punctate. The edges of the thorax, hemelytra and abdomen are paler than the rest. The hemelytral membranes are transparent. The disc of the underside is yellowish. The legs are green. The rostrum is testaceous (a dull orange or brownish colour) except for a black tip. The antennae are green. The body length is 7–8 lines, which is equivalent to about 15–17 mm.
