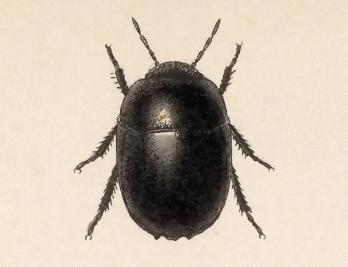
- Alkindus atratus

Scientific classification
- Kingdom: Animalia
- Phylum: Arthropoda
- Clade: Pancrustacea
- Class: Insecta
- Order: Hemiptera
- Suborder: Heteroptera
- Infraorder: Pentatomomorpha
- Superfamily: Pentatomoidea
- Family: Thyreocoridae; Amyot & Serville, 1843

Subfamilies
- Thyreocorinae; Corimelaeninae

= Thyreocoridae =

Family of true bugs

The Thyreocoridae are a family of shield bugs, known by common names that include black bugs, negro bugs or ebony bugs. Historically, a few authors have called this family "Corimelaenidae" (e.g.), but the name Thyreocoridae, published in 1843, has nomenclatural priority over Corimelaenidae, published in 1872. Other classifications have placed them as a subfamily within the broad family Cydnidae.

== Genera ==
There has been disagreement about how to treat subfamilies within the Thyreocoridae.

- Alkindus Distant, 1889
- Amyssonotum Horváth, 1919
- Carrabas Distant, 1908
- Corimelaena White, 1839
- Cydnoides Malloch, 1919
- Eumetopia Westwood, 1838
- Galgupha Amyot & Serville, 1843
- Godmania Horváth, 1919
- Pericrepis Horváth, 1919
- Pruhleria McAtee & Malloch, 1933
- Strombosoma Amyot & Serville, 1843
- Thyreocoris Schrank, 1801
