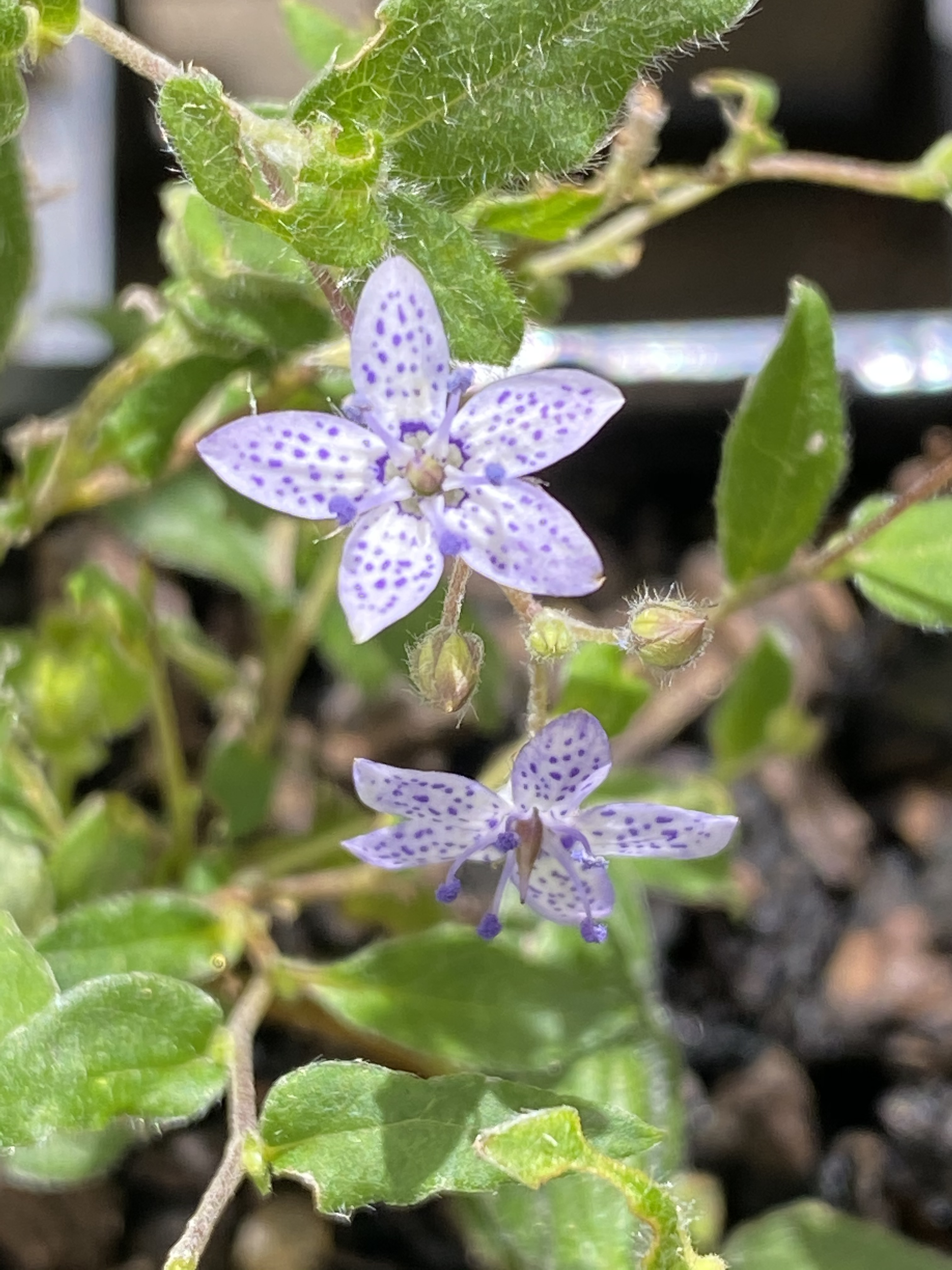

Conservation status
- Priority Four — Rare Taxa (DEC)

Scientific classification
- Kingdom: Plantae
- Clade: Tracheophytes
- Clade: Angiosperms
- Clade: Eudicots
- Clade: Asterids
- Order: Apiales
- Family: Pittosporaceae
- Genus: Marianthus
- Species: M. granulatus

Binomial name
- Marianthus granulatus (Turcz.) Benth.

Synonyms
- Billardiera granulata (Turcz.) E.M.Benn.; Marianthus parviflorus F.Muell.; Oncosporum granulatum Turcz.

= Marianthus granulatus =

Species of plant native to Australia

Marianthus granulatus is a species of flowering plant in the family Pittosporaceae and is endemic to a restricted part of the southwest of Western Australia. It is a twining shrub or climber with often clustered, egg-shaped to heart-shaped leaves and pale blue flowers with darker blue spots and yellow streaks, arranged in groups of three to five.

== Description ==
Marianthus granulatus is a twining shrub or climber with silky-hairy, warty new shoots. Its adult leaves are egg-shaped to heart-shaped and often clustered, 20–45 mm (0.79–1.77 in) long and 8–18 mm (0.31–0.71 in) wide on a petiole up to 3 mm (0.12 in) long. The flowers are borne in groups of three to five on hairy peduncle 30–40 mm (1.2–1.6 in) long with bracts up to 4 mm (0.16 in) long. The sepals are linear, blue and silky-hairy, 4–5 mm (0.16–0.20 in) long. The five petals are pale blue with darkening blue markings, 4–7 mm (0.16–0.28 in) long with yellow streaks. Flowering mainly occurs from October to December and the fruit is a blue, egg-shaped capsule about 5 mm (0.20 in) in diameter.

== Taxonomy ==
This species was first formally described in 1855 by Nikolai Turczaninow who gave it the name Oncosporum granulatum in the Bulletin de la Société Impériale des Naturalistes de Moscou from specimens collected by James Drummond. In 1863, George Bentham transferred the species to Marianthus as M. granulatus in his Fragmenta Phytographiae Australiae. The specific epithet (granulatus) means "granular", referring to the seeds.

== Distribution and habitat ==
Marianthus granulatus is restricted to the Porongorup Ranges in southern Western Australia, where it grows in woodland and forest in creek beds.

== Conservation status ==
This marianthus is listed as "Priority Four" by the Government of Western Australia Department of Biodiversity, Conservation and Attractions, meaning that it is rare or near threatened.
