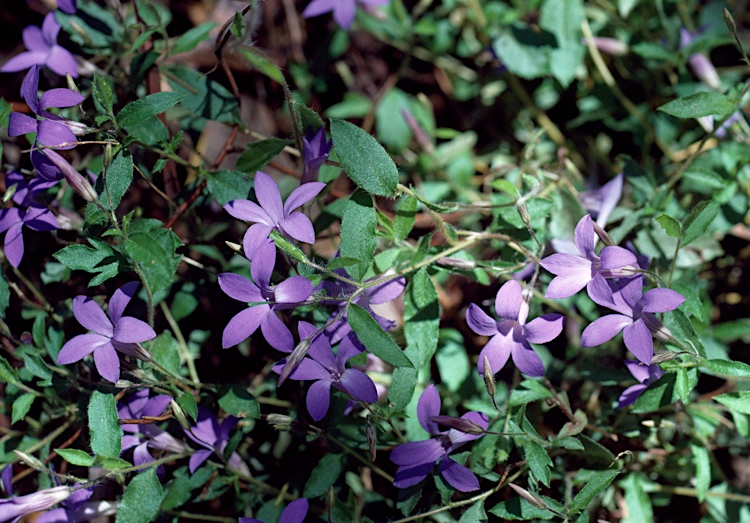
- In the Australian National Botanic Gardens

Scientific classification
- Kingdom: Plantae
- Clade: Tracheophytes
- Clade: Angiosperms
- Clade: Eudicots
- Clade: Asterids
- Order: Apiales
- Family: Pittosporaceae
- Genus: Marianthus
- Species: M. drummondianus

Binomial name
- Marianthus drummondianus (Putt.) Benth.

Synonyms
- Billardiera dorrienii Domin; Billardiera drummondiana (Putt.) E.M.Benn.; Billardiera drummondiana var. collina E.M.Benn.; Billardiera drummondiana (Putt.) E.M.Benn. var. drummondiana; Oncosporum drummondianum Putt.

= Marianthus drummondianus =

Species of plant native to Australia

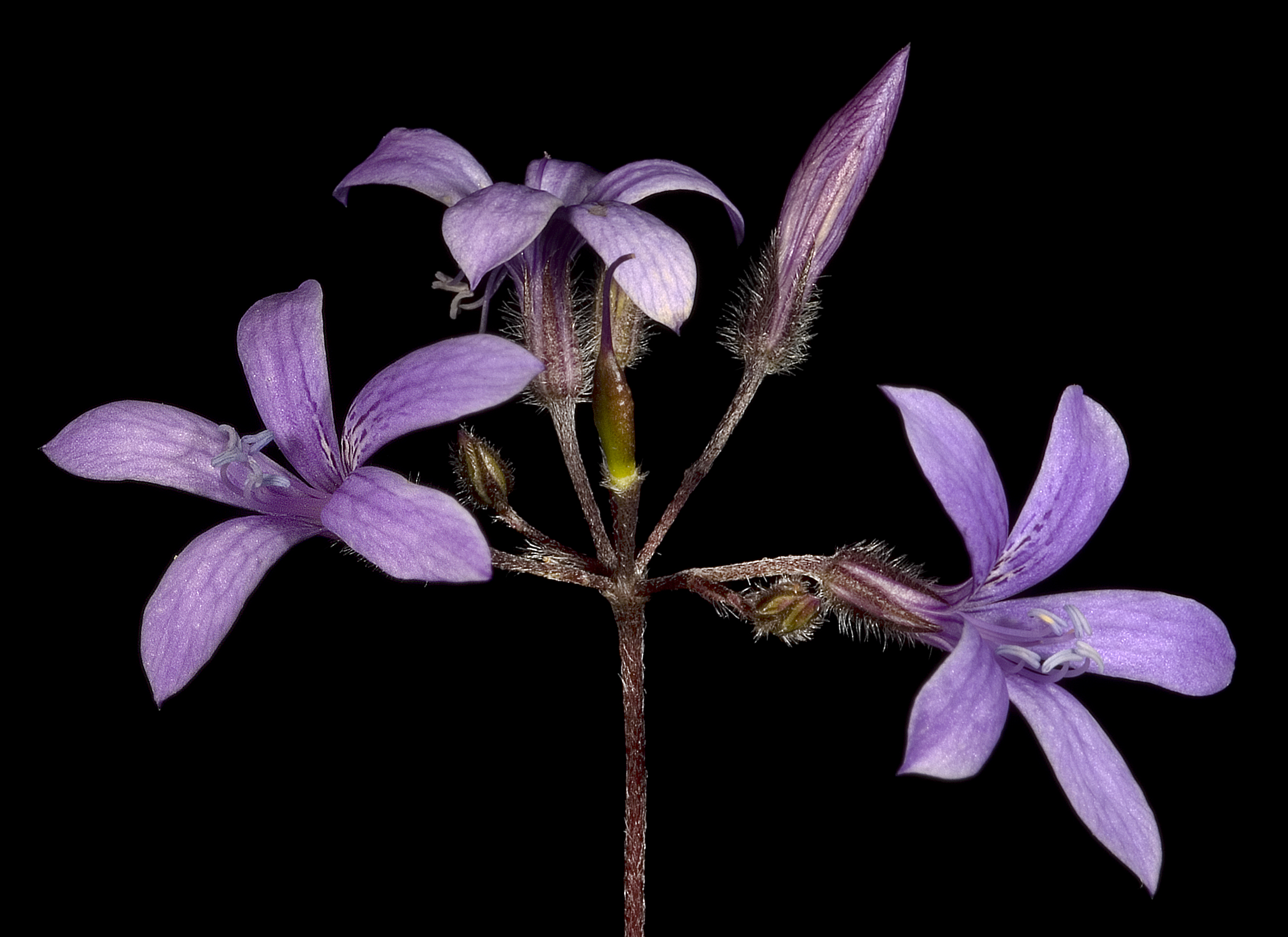
Flower detail

Marianthus drummondianus is a species of flowering plant in the family Pittosporaceae and is endemic to the southwest of Western Australia. It is a shrub, herb, or slender twiner with elliptic leaves and white, blue or purple flowers arranged in small clusters.

== Description ==
Marianthus drummondianus is a shrub, herb or slender climber with hairy new shoots. Its adult leaves are elliptic, 10–18 mm (0.39–0.71 in) long, 4–6 mm (0.16–0.24 in) wide and sessile. The leaves are hairy at first, but become glabrous with age, apart from on the margins. The flowers are borne in small groups on pendent, softly-hairy peduncle up to 23 mm (0.91 in) long. The sepals are linear, blue and hairy, about 5 mm (0.20 in) long. The five petals are spatula-shaped, white, blue or purple and 12–18 mm (0.47–0.71 in) long. Flowering mainly occurs from August to October.

== Taxonomy ==
This species was first formally described in 1845 by Alois (Aloys) Putterlick who gave it the name Oncosporum drummondianum in Lehmann's Plantae Preissianae. In 1863, George Bentham transferred the species to Marianthus as M. drummondianus in his Fragmenta Phytographiae Australiae. The specific epithet (drummondianus) honours James Drummond.

== Distribution and habitat ==
Marianthus drummondianus grows in open woodland and forest on slopes, near creeks and on roadsides from the Darling Range near Perth to the Porongurup National Park, in the Avon Wheatbelt, Esperance Plains, Jarrah Forest and Warren bioregions of south-western Western Australia.
