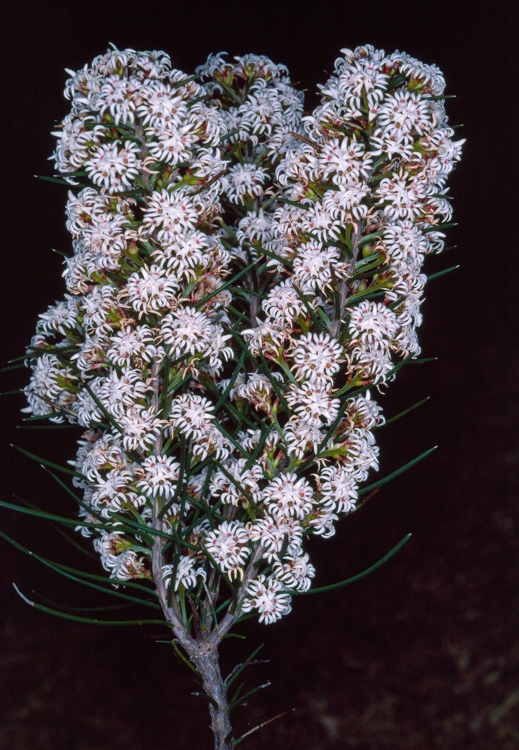
- In Kings Park

Scientific classification
- Kingdom: Plantae
- Clade: Tracheophytes
- Clade: Angiosperms
- Clade: Eudicots
- Order: Proteales
- Family: Proteaceae
- Genus: Conospermum
- Species: C. acerosum

Binomial name
- Conospermum acerosum Lindl.

= Conospermum acerosum =

Needle-leaved smokebush

Species of Australian shrub

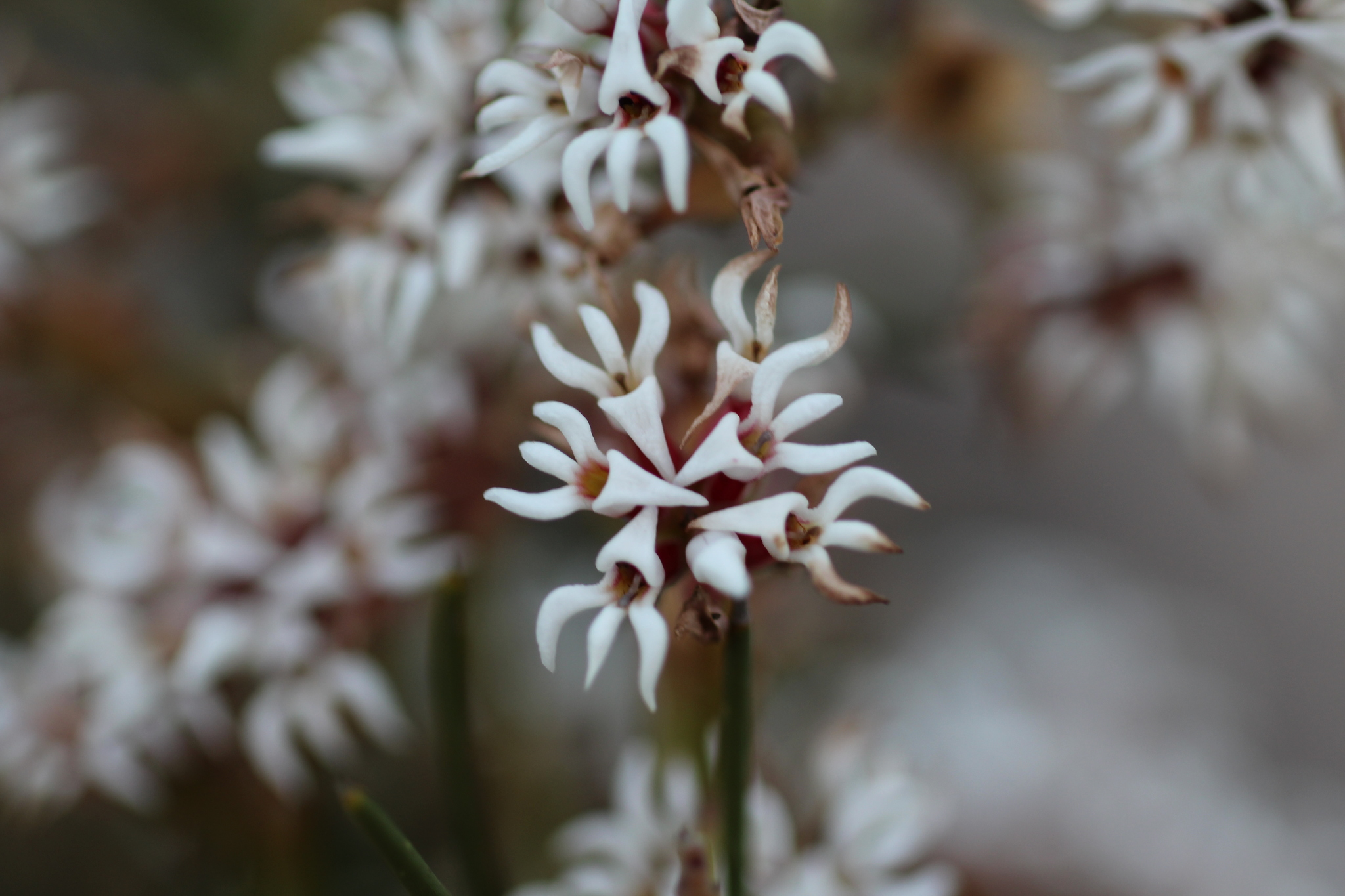
Flower detail

Conospermum acerosum, commonly known as needle-leaved smokebush, is a species of flowering plant in family Proteaceae and is endemic to the south west of Western Australia. It is spindly, erect or straggly shrub with needle-shaped or thread-like leaves, panicles of white or pink flowers and reddish brown nuts.

== Description ==
Conospermum acerosum is a spindly shrub, either erect or sprawling, that typically grows to 0.3–1.7 m (1 ft 0 in – 5 ft 7 in) high, usually with several unbranched stems growing from the base of the plant. It has sharply pointed, needle-shaped or thread-like leaves up to 100 mm (3.9 in) long and 0.5–1 mm (0.020–0.039 in) wide. The flowers are arranged in panicles of white, red or pink flowers, the flowers forming a tube 3.5–5 mm (0.14–0.20 in) long. The upper lip is 4.5–5.5 mm (0.18–0.22 in) long and the lower lip 1.0–1.5 mm (0.039–0.059 in) long with lobes 3.0–3.5 mm (0.12–0.14 in) long. Flowering occurs from July to November and the fruit is a reddish-brown nut 2.5–3.5 mm (0.098–0.138 in) long and about 2.8 mm (0.11 in) wide.

== Taxonomy ==
Conospermum acerosum was first formally described in John Lindley's 1839 A Sketch of the Vegetation of the Swan River Colony. Lindley referred to it as a "strange species" that "might be mistaken for a Colletia." In 1995, as part of her treatment of Conospermum for the Flora of Australia series of monographs, Eleanor Bennett published a subspecies, Conospermum acerosum subsp. hirsutum, based on material collected in 1901 by geologist and archaeologist William Dugald Campbell, and the both it and the autonym are accepted by the Australian Plant Census.

- Conospermum acerosum subsp. hirsutum has densely hairy stems and leaf bases, spreading or descending leaves, and flowers from August to October.
- Conospermum acerosum subsp. acerosum has more or less glabrous stems and leaf bases, curved, ascending leaves, and flowers from July to November.

== Distribution and habitat ==
Needle-leaved smokebush grows in sandy soil, often over laterite, from the Kalbarri National Park south to Augusta and inland as far as Coorow, in the Avon Wheatbelt, Geraldton Sandplains, Jarrah Forest and Swan Coastal Plain bioregions. Subspecies hirsutum occurs in the northern part of the distribution, from Kalbarri to Northampton, and subsp. acerosum from south of Northampton to near Perth, with isolated populations near Busselton and Nannup.

== Conservation status ==
Both subspecies of C. acerosum are listed as "not threatened" by the Government of Western Australia Department of Parks and Wildlife.
