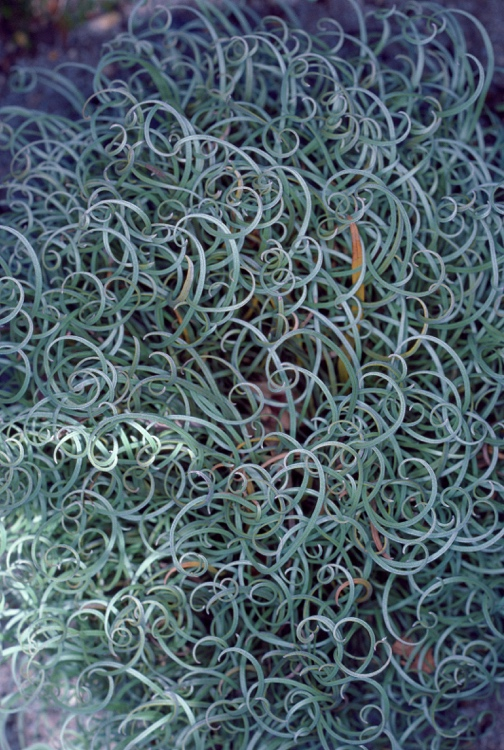
- Coiled leaves

Scientific classification
- Kingdom: Plantae
- Clade: Tracheophytes
- Clade: Angiosperms
- Clade: Eudicots
- Order: Proteales
- Family: Proteaceae
- Genus: Conospermum
- Species: C. capitatum

Binomial name
- Conospermum capitatum R.Br.

= Conospermum capitatum =

Species of shrub native to Australia

Conospermum capitatum is a species of flowering plant in the family Proteaceae, and is endemic to the south-west of Western Australia. It is a low, erect shrub with coiled leaves and head-like panicles of red to pale yellow and hairy, tube-shaped flowers.

== Description ==
Conospermum capitatum is a low, erect shrub that typically grows to a height of up to 40 cm (16 in). Its leaves are coiled, 20–360 mm (0.79–14.17 in) long and 2–6 mm (0.079–0.236 in) wide and covered with woolly wide hairs, at least at first. The flowers are arranged in dense, head-like panicles 15–35 mm (0.59–1.38 in) long on a densely hairy peduncle 4–5 mm (0.16–0.20 in) long. The bracteoles are 8–11 mm (0.31–0.43 in) long and 3–5 mm (0.12–0.20 in) wide and reddish-brown. The perianth is red to pale yellow and covered with woolly or silky hairs, forming a glabrous tube 5–7 mm (0.20–0.28 in) long. The upper lip is linear, 10–12 mm (0.39–0.47 in) long, the lower lip joined for 2.5 mm (0.098 in) long with lobes about 8 mm (0.31 in) long and 0.75 mm (0.030 in) wide. Flowering time varies with subspecies and the fruit is a hairy, rust-coloured nut 2.5–3.0 mm (0.098–0.118 in) long and about 3 mm (0.12 in) wide.

== Taxonomy ==
Conospermum capitatum was first formally described in 1811 by Robert Brown in the Transactions of the Linnean Society of London. The specific epithet (capitatum) means capitate.

In 1995, Eleanor Marion Bennett described two subspecies of C. capitatum, and the names and that of the autonym are accepted by the Australian Plant Census:

- Conospermum capitatum R.Br. subsp. capitatum (the autonym) has downy leaves less than 2 mm (0.079 in) wide, a distinct peduncle up to 70 mm (2.8 in) long, a woolly hairy perianth, and flowers in October and November.
- Conospermum capitatum subsp. glabratum E.M.Benn. has usually glabrous leaves more than 2 mm (0.079 in) wide, a peduncle up to 4–5 mm (0.16–0.20 in) long, a woolly hairy perianth, and flowers from October to December.
- Conospermum capitatum subsp. velutinum E.M.Benn. has white, velvety-hairy leaves between glabrous edge-veins, a peduncle up to 4–5 mm (0.16–0.20 in) long, a silky hairy perianth, and flowers in August and September.

== Distribution and habitat ==
Conospermum capitatum is found on hill slopes and winter-wet flat areas in the Avon Wheatbelt, Jarrah Forest, Swan Coastal Plain and Warren bioregions of south-western Western Australia where it grows in sandy, loamy and clay soils often over laterite. Subspecies capitatum is found on flats and hillslopes in coastal regions of the south-west, in the Jarrah Forest and Warren bioregions, subsp. glabratum on flats, gentle slopes and winter-wet areas and is widespread between Perth and Nannup in the Avon Wheatbelt, Jarrah Forest, Swan Coastal Plain and Warren bioregions. Subspecies velutinum grows in sandy soils over laterite, and is common between Albany, Mount Barker and the Porongurup National Park.

== Conservation status ==
All three subspecies of C. capitatum are listed as "not threatened" by the Government of Western Australia Department of Parks and Wildlife.
