= Megachile lucifer =

Scientific classification
- Kingdom: Animalia
- Phylum: Arthropoda
- Clade: Pancrustacea
- Class: Insecta
- Order: Hymenoptera
- Family: Megachilidae
- Genus: Megachile
- Species: M. lucifer

Binomial name
- Megachile lucifer Prendergast & Campbell, 2025

Species of leafcutter bee (Megachile)

Megachile lucifer, better known as Lucifer Bee, is a species of bee in the family Megachilidae. The bee was discovered by Australian scientist Kit Prendergast in November 2019 in Western Australia, during an observation of a rare wildflower, Marianthus aquilonaris.

== Description ==
Megachile lucifer is a small non-metallic black bee. Females have small, triangular horns emerging from the clypeus (one of the segments on the face). These horns are about 0.9 millimetres (0.035 in) long, and are considered a distinguishing feature of this species.

Females are about 9.8 millimetres (0.39 in) long. Males are 8.9 millimetres (0.35 in) and slightly browner than the females. They also lack the characteristic horns.

== Taxonomy ==
The species was first described by Kit Prendergast and Joshua W. Campbell in 2025 based on specimens collected by Prendergast in 2019 as part of a survey of pollinators in the vicinity of M. aquilonaris. They tentatively assigned it to the subgenus Hackeriapis within the genus Megachile, but noted that Hackeriapis was last revised in 1994 and was in need of revision.

The bee was named "lucifer" because of its tiny, devil-like horns; Prendergast also noted that lucifer means "light bringer" and hoped to "better conserve, survey, and protect native bees and their native habitats" through her description of the species. The name was inspired by the television series Lucifer.

== Ecology and conservation ==
Megachile lucifer is only known to visit two plant species, M. aquilonaris and Eucalyptus livida. It has only been collected between November 2 and 4, 2019, and was not seen in October 2022 or 2024. The species is only known from the Bremer Ranges in Western Australia, near Lake Johnson. Based on its limited distribution, Prendergast and Campbell concluded that it may fit the IUCN definition of a critically endangered species, but given that E. livida has a wider range than M. aquilonaris, the bee may be distributed beyond this limited area.

Horns are only present on the females, and may be used as a defence mechanism or to access flowers.
