= Marianthus microphyllus =

Scientific classification
- Kingdom: Plantae
- Clade: Tracheophytes
- Clade: Angiosperms
- Clade: Eudicots
- Clade: Asterids
- Order: Apiales
- Family: Pittosporaceae
- Genus: Marianthus
- Species: M. microphyllus

Binomial name
- Marianthus microphyllus (Turcz.) Benth.

Synonyms
- Billardiera villosa (Turcz.) E.M.Benn.; Marianthus rhytidosporeus F.Muell.; Marianthus villosus (Turcz.) Benth.; Oncosporum microphyllum Turcz.; Oncosporum villosum Turcz.

Species of plant native to Australia

Marianthus microphyllus is a species of flowering plant in the family Pittosporaceae and is endemic to the south of Western Australia. It is a small, erect, spreading shrub with clustered, funnel-shaped, stem-clasping leaves and deep blue to almost purple flowers that darken as they age, arranged singly in leaf axils.

== Description ==
Marianthus microphyllus is an erect, spreading shrub with sharp, hairy side shoots. Its adult leaves are funnel-shaped, stem-clasping, mostly clustered, and up to 10 mm (0.39 in) long. The flowers are borne singly in leaf axils, the sepals up to 3 mm (0.12 in) long. The five petals are deep blue, up to 10 mm (0.39 in) long and darken to almost purple as they age. Flowering mainly occurs from September to November and the fruit is a blue capsule 7–8 mm (0.28–0.31 in) long that turns brown as it ages.

== Taxonomy ==
This species was first formally described in 1855 by Nikolai Turczaninow who gave it the name Oncosporum microphyllum in the Bulletin de la Société Impériale des Naturalistes de Moscou from specimens collected by James Drummond. In 1863, George Bentham transferred the species to Marianthus as M. microphyllus in Flora Australiensis. The specific epithet (microphyllus) means "small-leaved".

== Distribution and habitat ==
Marianthus microphyllus grows in open mallee and dry woodland between Bremer Bay and Mount Maxwell and in the Frank Hann National Park in the Esperance Plains and Mallee bioregions of southern Western Australia.

== Conservation status ==
This marianthus is listed as "not threatened" by the Government of Western Australia Department of Biodiversity, Conservation and Attractions.
