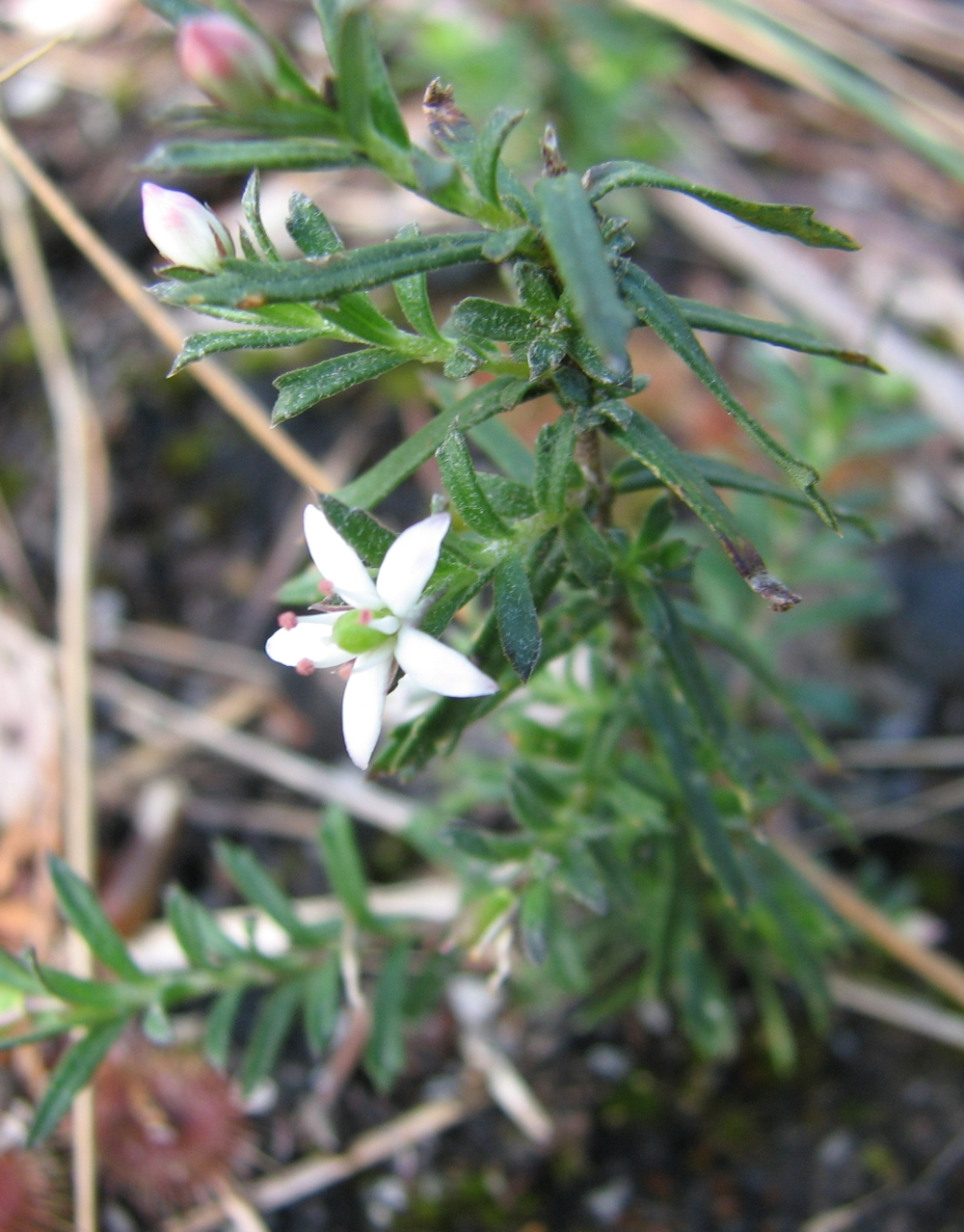
- Rhytidosporum procumbens in Bunyip State Park, Victoria

Scientific classification
- Kingdom: Plantae
- Clade: Tracheophytes
- Clade: Angiosperms
- Clade: Eudicots
- Clade: Asterids
- Order: Apiales
- Family: Pittosporaceae
- Genus: Rhytidosporum
- Species: R. procumbens

Binomial name
- Rhytidosporum procumbens (Hook.) F.Muell.

Synonyms
- Billardiera procumbens (Hook.) E.M.Benn.; Bursaria procumbens (Hook.) Putt.; Bursaria stuartiana F.Muell. ex Klatt; Campylanthera ericoides Lindl.; Marianthus procumbens (Hook.) Benth.; Pittosporum nanum Hook.; Pittosporum procumbens Hook.; Pronaya ericoides (Lindl.) Walp.; Rhytidosporum procumbens F.Muell. nom. inval.; Rhytidosporum stuartianum F.Muell. nom. inval.; Rhytidosporum stuartianum F.Muell. ex Hook.f.

= Rhytidosporum procumbens =

Species of flowering plant

Rhytidosporum procumbens, commonly referred to as White Marianth, is a member of the family Pittosporaceae. The dwarf, perennial shrub is characterised by single or small groups of 2-3 white flowers measuring 15mm in diameter which are present in the upper leaf axils during August-December. The 5-20mm leaves are narrow in shape with pointed or 3-toothed tips and margins curved under.

R. procumbens is an Australian native and endemic that is locally common within its preferred growing conditions but has an otherwise limited distribution. Thus, it is generally restricted to New South Wales, Victoria, and Tasmania.

In 1836, the species was first formally described by William Jackson Hooker, an English botanist. The species was then later transferred from its original genus, Pittosporum, into Rhytidosporum, which was first described in 1862 by Ferdinand von Mueller, a Victorian Government Botanist.

== Description & growth habit ==
R. procumbens presents as a dwarf, erect to prostrate, shrub which grows to approximately 40cm in height. Finely pubescent young stems become hairless and branched during phase change. Sessile leaves have pointed tips and may be alternate or clustered in insertion, typically measuring 5-20mm in length and 1-3.5mm in width. Leaf margins may be entire or 3-toothed, presenting flat or slightly down-curved, and often thickened toward the abaxial leaf surface. The leaf surface may appear hairless to minutely tomentose. Flowers consist of 5-6 free petals, each 3-8mm in length, and are typically white; however, corolla tips and sepals may appear pale pink or purple in colour. Petals may also appear mauve, pink, or red on outer surface. Flowers are single or in small clusters of 2 or 3 and are held on floral stalks measuring 2-15mm long. Following the falling of petals, the flower stalks elongate and curve downwards.

== Taxonomy ==
R. procumbens is a member of the family Pittosporaceae, commonly known as the cheesewood family. This is principally an Australian family of flowering plants; however, some species extend their distribution into south-east Asia and parts of Africa. There are some 200 species in 9 genera which are represented in most tropical and subtropical regions with some species extending into alpine areas.

Since its initial formal description in 1836 (Hooker), R. procumbens has been embraced by numerous genera, including Pittosporum, Bursaria, Marianthus, and Billardiera, before Rhytidosporum was reinstated as a separate genus.

== Distribution & occurrence ==
The genus Rhytidosporum is both native and endemic to Australia with the distribution of R. procumbens largely restricted to south-eastern Australia. While the species most commonly occurs in New South Wales, Victoria, and Tasmania, occasional occurrence in both Queensland and South Australia has been previously noted.

R. procumbens is typical of forest, woodland, heath, and scrubland environments, growing primarily in the subtropical biome. Growing conditions are characterised by well-drained sandy or stony soils in woodlands and lowland forests with access to full-sun or semi-shade.
