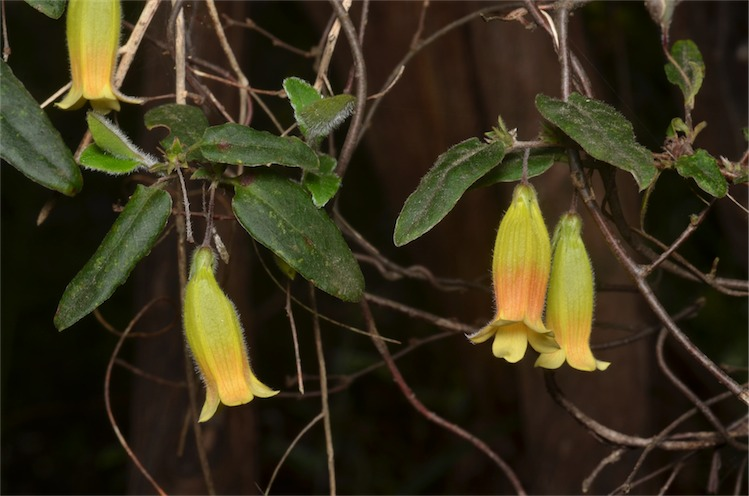
- In the Grampians National Park

Scientific classification
- Kingdom: Plantae
- Clade: Tracheophytes
- Clade: Angiosperms
- Clade: Eudicots
- Clade: Asterids
- Order: Apiales
- Family: Pittosporaceae
- Genus: Marianthus
- Species: M. bignoniaceus

Binomial name
- Marianthus bignoniaceus F.Muell.

Synonyms
- Billardiera bignoniacea (F.Muell.) E.M.Benn.

= Marianthus bignoniaceus =

Orange bell-climber

Species of plant native to Australia

Marianthus bignoniaceus, commonly known as orange bell-creeper, is a species of flowering plant in the family Pittosporaceae and is native to the Australian states of Victoria and South Australia. It is a slender climber with egg-shaped or narrowly egg-shaped leaves and green and orange or salmon-pink flowers arranged singly or in pairs.

== Description ==
Marianthus bignoniaceus is a slender twiner with reddish brown stems that are silky-hairy at first, but become glabrous as they age. Its adult leaves are egg-shaped or narrowly egg-shaped, 12–50 mm (0.47–1.97 in) long and 6–25 mm (0.24–0.98 in) wide on a short petiole. Both surfaces of the leaves have scattered, soft hairs. The flowers are borne singly or in pairs on a slender, pendent pedicel 3–7 mm (0.12–0.28 in) long, the sepals lance-shaped and joined at the base, 2–6 mm (0.079–0.236 in) long and covered with shaggy hairs. The five petals are 15–22 mm (0.59–0.87 in) long joined at the base to form a bell-shaped, green and orange or salmon-pink tube, the lobes 2–5 mm (0.079–0.197 in) long. Flowering mainly occurs from September to January, but flowers are often present all year.

== Taxonomy ==
Marianthus bignoniaceus was first formally described in 1854 by Ferdinand von Mueller in Transactions of the Philosophical Society of Victoria. The specific epithet (bignoniaceus) means "two colours".

== Distribution and habitat ==
This climber grows in moist forest and dense scrubs near streams, sometimes between rocks in higher places. It is the only species of Marianthus found outside of Western Australia and is found in the Grampians National Park, nearby Black Range in Victoria, in and near the Mount Lofty Ranges and on Kangaroo Island in South Australia.
