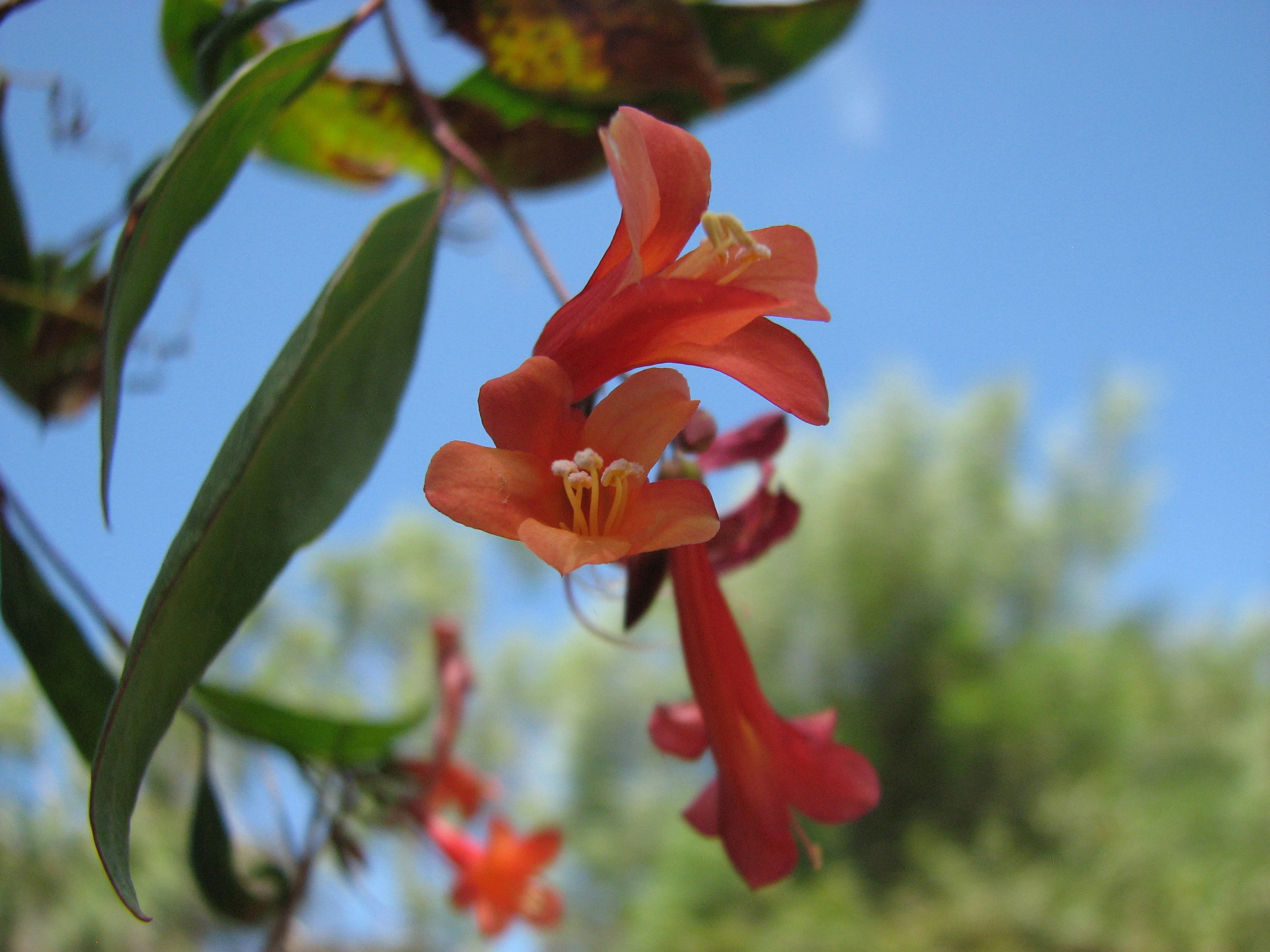
- In Maranoa Gardens

Scientific classification
- Kingdom: Plantae
- Clade: Tracheophytes
- Clade: Angiosperms
- Clade: Eudicots
- Clade: Asterids
- Order: Apiales
- Family: Pittosporaceae
- Genus: Marianthus
- Species: M. erubescens

Binomial name
- Marianthus erubescens Putt.

Synonyms
- Billardiera erubescens (Putt.) E.M.Benn.; Marianthus purpureus Turcz.

= Marianthus erubescens =

Species of shrub

Marianthus erubescens is a species of flowering plant in the family Pittosporaceae and is endemic to the southwest of Western Australia. It is a woody, glabrous shrub or climber, with narrowly elliptic leaves and down-curved, red flowers arranged groups of three to six.

== Description ==
Marianthus erubescens is a glabrous, woody shrub or climber with reddish stems. Its adult leaves are narrowly elliptic, 40–50 mm (1.6–2.0 in) long and 20–22 mm (0.79–0.87 in) wide on a petiole up to 10 mm (0.39 in) long. The flowers are borne in groups of three to six on down-curved peduncles up to 30 mm (1.2 in) long, each flower on a pedicel 12–15 mm (0.47–0.59 in) long. The sepals are 2–3 mm (0.079–0.118 in) long, of unequal sizes, and fall off as the flowers mature. The five petals are red and joined to form a curved tube 15–26 mm (0.59–1.02 in) long. Flowering occurs from August to December and the fruit is a spindle-shaped capsule 10–12 mm (0.39–0.47 in) long.

== Taxonomy ==
Marianthus erubescens was formally described in 1839 by Alois (Aloys) Putterlick in Novarum Stirpium Decades of specimens collected by John Septimus Roe in the Swan River Colony. The specific epithet (erubescens) means "reddening" or "blushing".

== Distribution and habitat ==
This species of marianthus grows in woodland, shrubland or mallee, on sandplains and breakaways, on granite outcrops or limestone between Morawa, Merredin, the Stirling Ranges and Cape Naturaliste in the Avon Wheatbelt, Esperance Plains, Geraldton Sandplains, Jarrah Forest, Swan Coastal Plain and Warren bioregions of south-western Western Australia.
