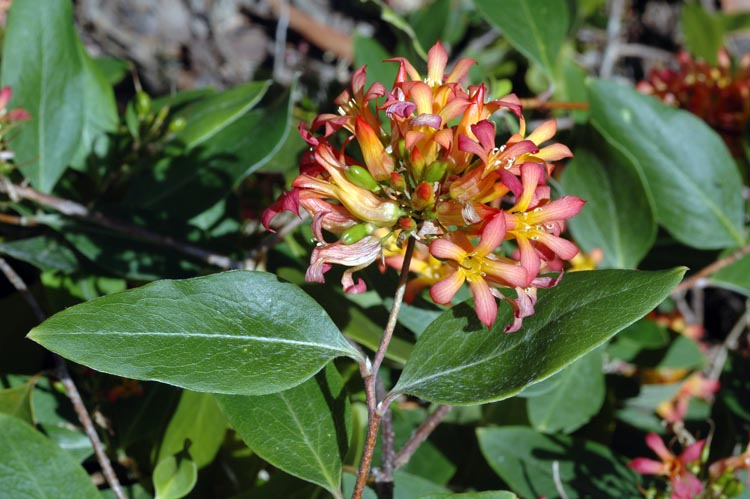

Scientific classification
- Kingdom: Plantae
- Clade: Tracheophytes
- Clade: Angiosperms
- Clade: Eudicots
- Clade: Asterids
- Order: Apiales
- Family: Pittosporaceae
- Genus: Marianthus
- Species: M. ringens

Binomial name
- Marianthus ringens (Drumm. ex Harv.) F.Muell.

Synonyms
- Billardiera ringens (Drumm. ex Harv.) E.M.Benn.; Calopetalon ringens Drumm. ex Harv.

= Marianthus ringens =

Species of plant native to Australia

Marianthus ringens is a species of flowering plant in the family Pittosporaceae and is endemic to the southwest of Western Australia. It is a shrub or climber with thick, elliptic leaves and yellow and orange-red flowers that darken as they age, arranged dense clusters.

== Description ==
Marianthus ringens is a woody shrub or climber with silky hairy new shoots that become glabrous as they age. Its adult leaves are elliptic, thick, 80–105 mm (3.1–4.1 in) long and 9–22 mm (0.35–0.87 in) wide on a petiole up to 10 mm (0.39 in) long. The flowers are borne in dense clusters, the five sepals 3–4 mm (0.12–0.16 in) long and creamy-red. The five petals are yellow grading to orange-red, 12–21 mm (0.47–0.83 in) long and darken as they age. Flowering occurs in August and September and the fruit is a thin, spindle-shaped capsule 7–9 mm (0.28–0.35 in) long and 3–4 mm (0.12–0.16 in) in diameter.

== Taxonomy ==
This species was first formally described in 1855 by William Henry Harvey who gave it the name Calopetalon ringens in Hooker's Journal of Botany and Kew Garden Miscellany from an unpublished description by James Drummond. In 1859, Ferdinand von Mueller transferred the species to Marianthus as M. ringens in his Fragmenta Phytographiae Australiae. The specific epithet (ringens) means "with a wide-open mouth", referring to the flowers.

== Distribution and habitat ==
Marianthus ringens grows in wet places between Dongara and the Murchison River in the Geraldton Sandplains bioregion of south-western Western Australia.

== Conservation status ==
This marianthus is listed as "not threatened" by the Government of Western Australia Department of Biodiversity, Conservation and Attractions.
