= Conospermum wycherleyi =

Scientific classification
- Kingdom: Plantae
- Clade: Tracheophytes
- Clade: Angiosperms
- Clade: Eudicots
- Order: Proteales
- Family: Proteaceae
- Genus: Conospermum
- Species: C. wycherleyi

Binomial name
- Conospermum wycherleyi E.M.Benn.

Species of shrub native to Australia

Conospermum wycherleyi is a species of flowering plant in the family Proteaceae and is endemic to the south-west of Western Australia. It is an erect shrub with spoon-shaped to lance-shaped leaves with the narrower end towards the base, spike-like panicles of woolly, white, tube-shaped flowers and nuts with cream-coloured to orange hairs.

== Description ==
Conospermum wycherleyi is an erect shrub that typically grows to a height of 1.5–1.5 m (4 ft 11 in – 4 ft 11 in). Its leaves are spoon-shaped to lance-shaped with the narrower end towards the base, 20–130 mm (0.79–5.12 in) long, 3–21 mm (0.12–0.83 in) wide and arranged at the base of the flowers. The flowers are borne in spike-like panicles on a silky, velvety hairy peduncle 190–570 mm (7.5–22.4 in) long with dark brown bracteoles 3.0–8.5 mm (0.12–0.33 in) long, 2.4–6 mm (0.094–0.236 in) wide and densely hairy. The flowers are white and woolly, forming a tube 2.0–5.5 mm (0.079–0.217 in) long, the upper lip egg-shaped, 2.25–3.5 mm (0.089–0.138 in) long and 1.5–2.5 mm (0.059–0.098 in) wide, the lower lip with narrowly oblong lobes 1.0–1.5 mm (0.039–0.059 in) long and 0.2–0.3 mm (0.0079–0.0118 in) wide and covered with shaggy, silky hairs. Flowering time depends on subspecies, and the fruit is a hairy nut about 3.0–3.2 mm (0.12–0.13 in) long and 2.50–2.75 mm (0.098–0.108 in) wide with cream-coloured hairs, woolly hairs.

== Taxonomy ==
Conospermum wycherleyi was first formally described in 1995 by Eleanor Marion Bennett in the Flora of Australia from specimens collected by Charles Gardner near Eneabba Creek in 1948. The specific epithet (wycherleyi) honours Paul Wycherley, the director of Kings Park and Botanical Garden from 1971 to 1992.

In the same edition of Flora of Australia, Bennett described C. wycherleyi subsp.glabrum, and its name, and the name of the autonym are accepted by the Australian Plant Census:

- Conospermum wycherleyi subsp. glabrum E.M.Benn. has the upper lip of the flowers 2.25–2.50 mm (0.089–0.098 in) long, the lower lip joined for 1.25–1.50 mm (0.049–0.059 in) and flowers from July to October.
- Conospermum wycherleyi E.M.Benn. subsp. wycherleyi (the autonym), has the upper lip of the flowers about 3.2 mm (0.13 in) long, the lower lip joined for 2.0–2.25 mm (0.079–0.089 in) and flowers in September.

== Distribution and habitat ==
This species of Conospermum grows in sandy soils and laterite on sandplains near Badgingarra and Eneabba and north to Walkaway in the Geraldton Sandplains and Jarrah Forest bioregions of south-western Western Australia. Subspecies glabrum occurs between Lake Logue and Walkaway, and subsp. wycherleyi grows near Eneabba.
