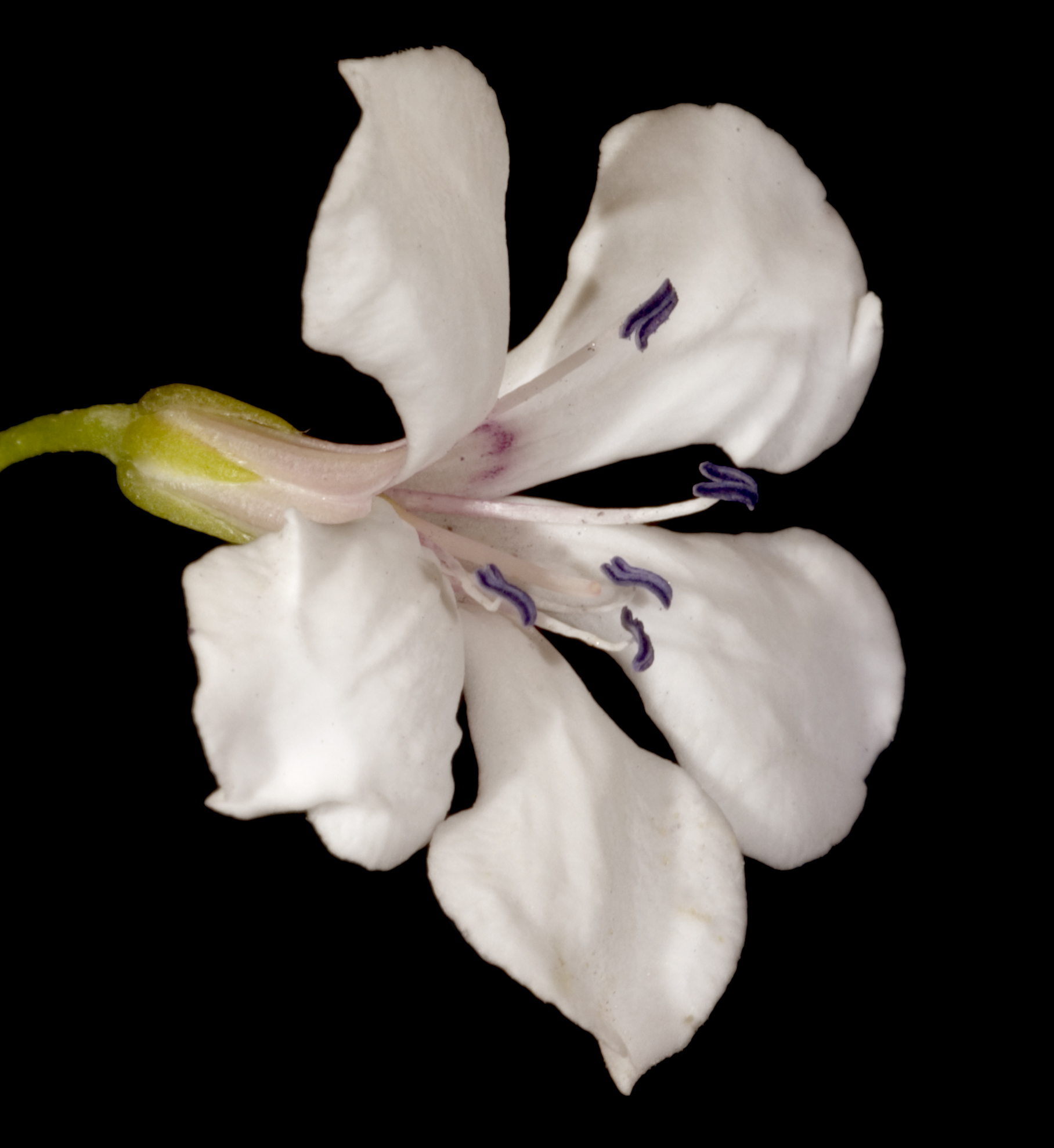

Scientific classification
- Kingdom: Plantae
- Clade: Tracheophytes
- Clade: Angiosperms
- Clade: Eudicots
- Clade: Asterids
- Order: Apiales
- Family: Pittosporaceae
- Genus: Marianthus
- Species: M. candidus

Binomial name
- Marianthus candidus Hügel ex Endl.

Synonyms
- Billardiera candida (Hügel ex Endl.) E.M.Benn.

= Marianthus candidus =

Species of plant native to Australia

Marianthus candidus, commonly known as white marianthus, is a species of flowering plant in the family Pittosporaceae and is endemic to the south-west of Western Australia. It is a twining shrub or climber with elliptic leaves and white flowers arranged in groups of twenty to thirty and becoming fawn or pink as they age.

== Description ==
Marianthus candidus is a twining shrub or climber with warty stems that are silky-hairy at first, but become glabrous as they age. Its adult leaves are elliptic, 40–70 mm (1.6–2.8 in) long and 12–15 mm (0.47–0.59 in) wide on a petiole 2–8 mm (0.079–0.315 in) long. The lower surface of the leaves is silky-hairy. The flowers are arranged in groups of ten to thirty on a rachis 40–55 mm (1.6–2.2 in) long the peduncle and pedicels less than 10 mm (0.39 in) long. The sepals are egg-shaped, 3.5–5.0 mm (0.14–0.20 in) long, and pink and white. The five petals are 12–22 mm (0.47–0.87 in) long, white, fading to fawn or pink and joined at the base to form a short tube with spatula-shaped, spreading lobes. Flowering mainly occurs in October and November.

== Taxonomy ==
Marianthus candidus was first formally described in 1837 by Stephan Endlicher in Enumeratio plantarum quas in Novae Hollandiae ora austro-occidentali ad fluvium Cygnorum et in sinu Regis Georgii collegit Carolus Liber Baro de Hügel from an unpublished description by Charles von Hügel of a plant he collected in the Swan River Colony. The specific epithet (candidus) means "pure glossy white".

== Distribution and habitat ==
White marianthus grows in coastal heath, on limestone plains and granite outcrops, near streams or in forest south from Perth to Cape Leeuwin and Manjimup in the Esperance Plains, Jarrah Forest, Swan Coastal Plain and Warren bioregions of south-western Western Australia.

== Conservation status ==
Marianthus candidus is listed as "not threatened" by the Government of Western Australia Department of Biodiversity, Conservation and Attractions.
