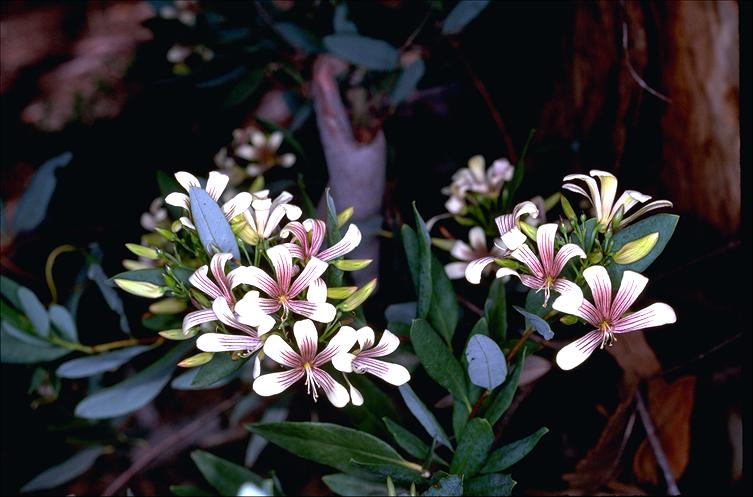
- In the Australian National Botanic Gardens

Scientific classification
- Kingdom: Plantae
- Clade: Tracheophytes
- Clade: Angiosperms
- Clade: Eudicots
- Clade: Asterids
- Order: Apiales
- Family: Pittosporaceae
- Genus: Marianthus
- Species: M. bicolor

Binomial name
- Marianthus bicolor (Putt.) F.Muell.

Synonyms
- Billardiera bicolor (Putt.) E.M.Benn.; Billardiera bicolor (Putt.) E.M.Benn. var. bicolor; Billardiera bicolor var. lineata (F.Muell.) E.M.Benn.; Marianthus lineatus F.Muell.; Marianthus pictus Lindl.; Oncosporum bicolor Putt. nom. illeg., nom. superfl.; Oncosporum bicolor Putt.

= Marianthus bicolor =

Painted marianthus

Species of plant native to Australia

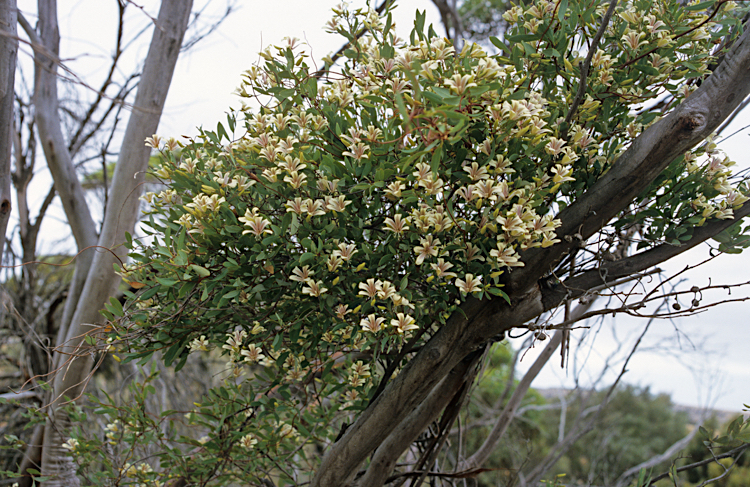
Habit

Marianthus bicolor, commonly known as painted marianthus, is a species of flowering plant in the family Pittosporaceae and is endemic to the southwest of Western Australia. It is a low, erect, spreading shrub or climber with narrowly elliptic leaves and white to cream-coloured flowers with maroon or purple striations flowers arranged in branched clusters.

== Description ==
Marianthus bicolor is a low, erect, spreading shrub or climber with reddish purple new stems. Its adult leaves are narrowly elliptic, 26–45 mm (1.0–1.8 in) long and 5–12 mm (0.20–0.47 in) wide on a short petiole. The leaves are thick and both surfaces of the mature leaves are covered with a waxy bloom. The flowers are borne in branched clusters on a peduncle 15–20 mm (0.59–0.79 in) long, the sepals egg-shaped, thickened and wavy, up to 1.5 mm (0.059 in) long and yellow on the outer surface. The five petals are narrowly spatula-shaped, 10–14 mm (0.39–0.55 in) long and up to 3.5 mm (0.14 in) wide, white to cream-coloured with maroon or purple striations. Flowering mainly occurs from December to March.

== Taxonomy ==
This species was first formally described in 1839 by Alois (Aloys) Putterlick in Novarum Stirpium Decades. In 1860, Ferdinand von Mueller transferred the species to Marianthus as M. bicolor in his Fragmenta Phytographiae Australiae. The specific epithet (bicolor) means "two colours".

== Distribution and habitat ==
Marianthus bicolor grows in mallee in valleys, on hills, flats, sandplains and roadsides, and is widespread in the south-west of Western Australia, mainly from the Darling Range to Ravensthorpe.

== Conservation status ==
Marianthus bicolor is listed as "not threatened" by the Government of Western Australia Department of Biodiversity, Conservation and Attractions.
