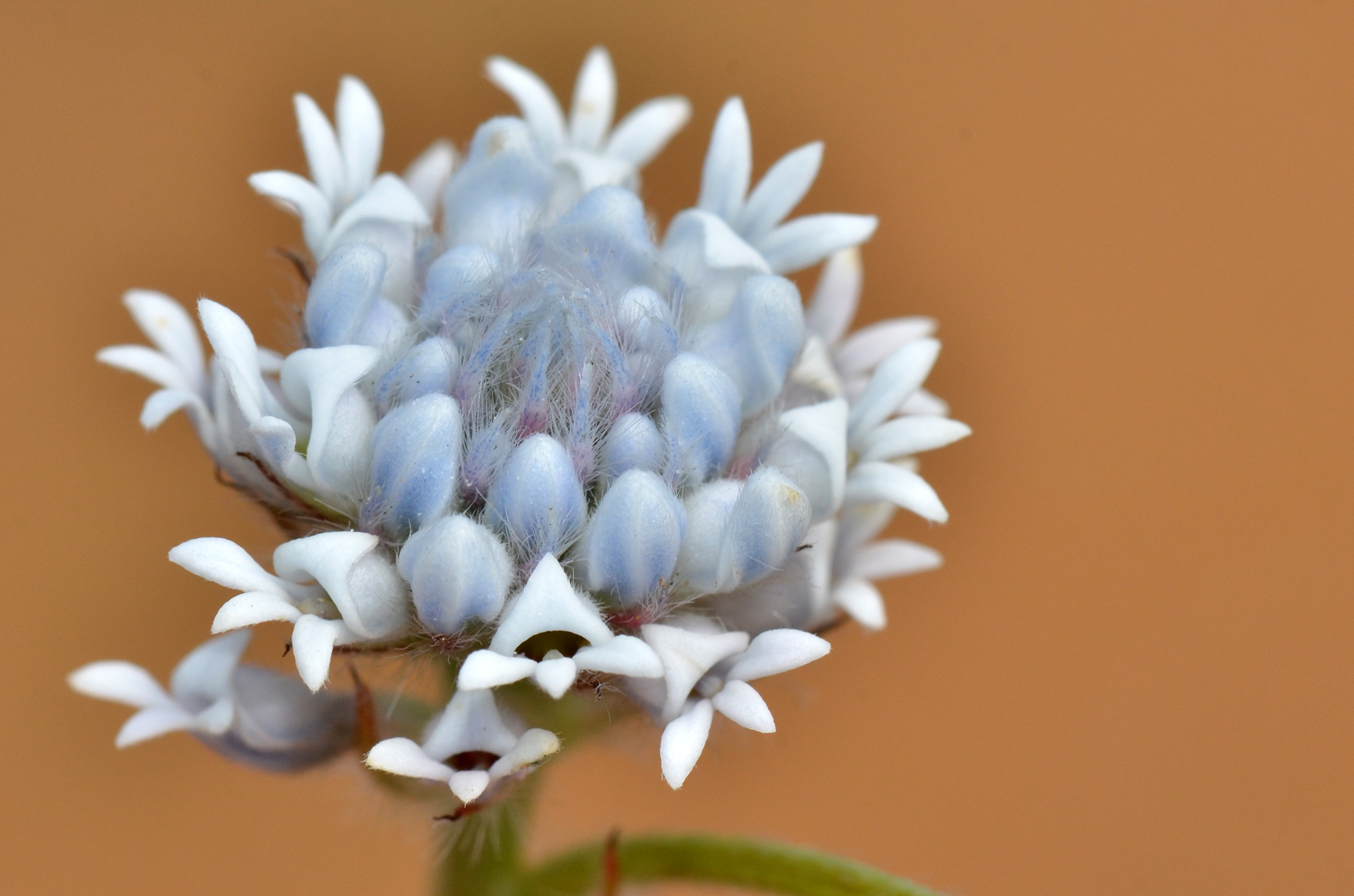
- Subspecies unicephalatum
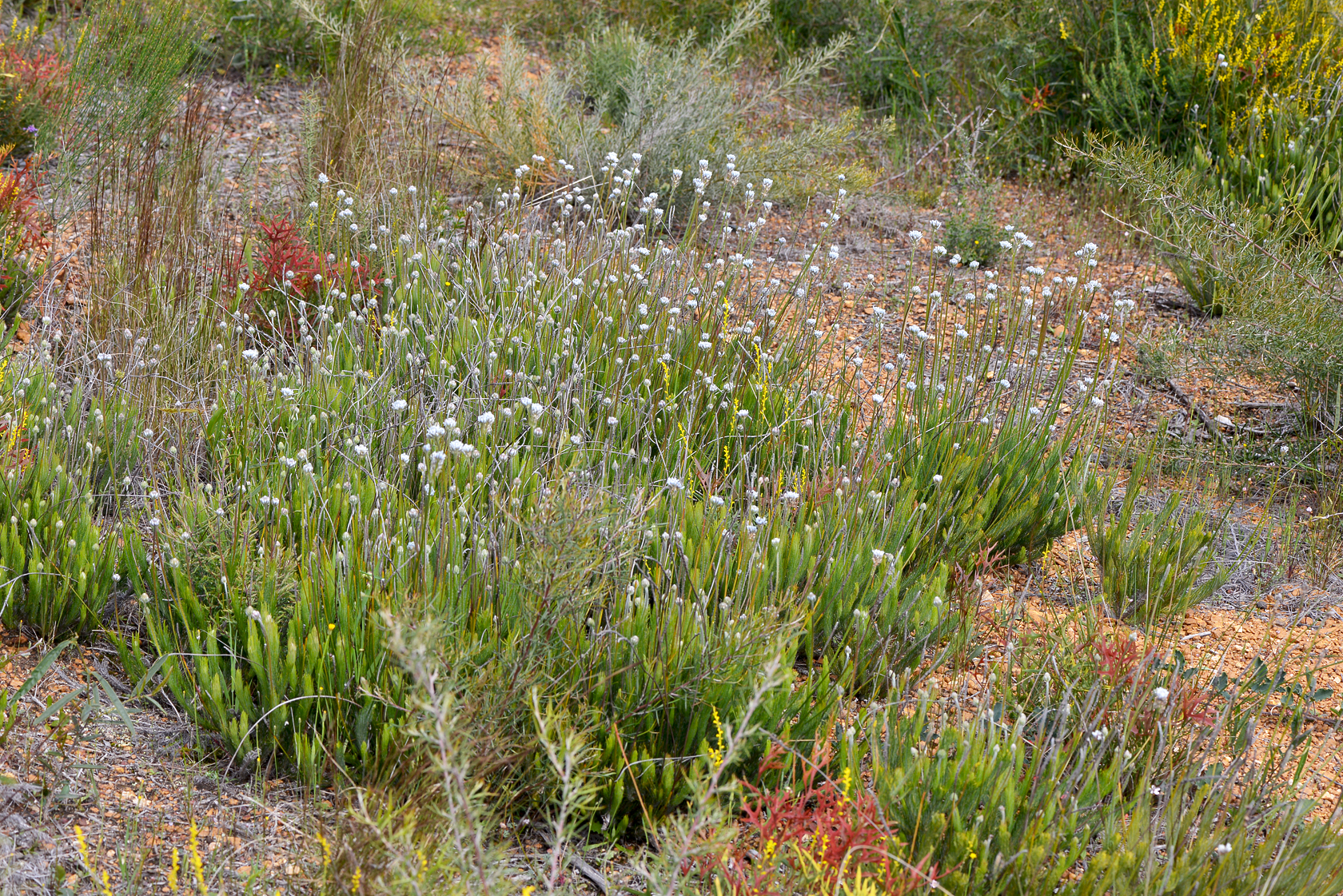
- Habit subsp. unicephalatum

Scientific classification
- Kingdom: Plantae
- Clade: Embryophytes
- Clade: Tracheophytes
- Clade: Spermatophytes
- Clade: Angiosperms
- Clade: Eudicots
- Order: Proteales
- Family: Proteaceae
- Genus: Conospermum
- Species: C. densiflorum

Binomial name
- Conospermum densiflorum Lindl.

= Conospermum densiflorum =

Species of shrub native to Australia

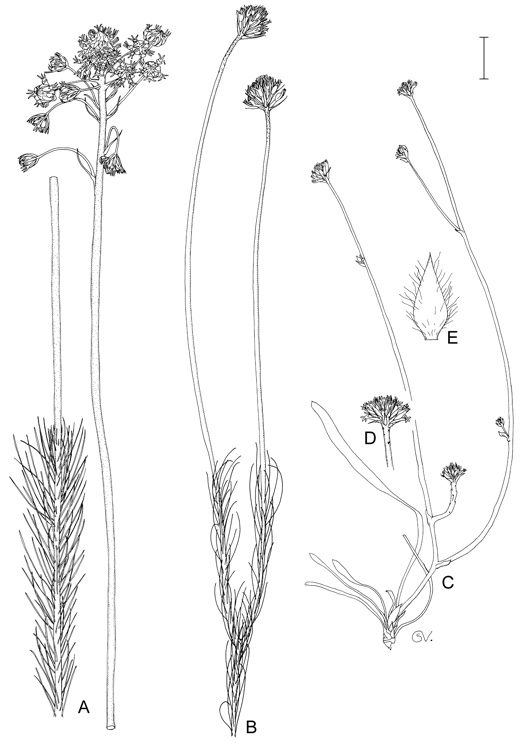
A=subsp. densiflorum; B, C, D, E = subsp. unicephalatum

Conospermum densiflorum, commonly known as crown smokebush, is a species of flowering plant in the family Proteaceae and is endemic to the south-west of Western Australia. It is an erect, much-branched shrub with thread-like leaves at the base of the plant, and spikes or corymbs of velvety, cream-coloured or blue, tube-shaped flowers.

== Description ==
Conospermum densiflorum is an erect, much-branched shrub that typically grows to a height of up to 0.3–1 m (1 ft 0 in – 3 ft 3 in). It has thread-like leaves 12–65 mm (0.47–2.56 in) long and 0.25–0.6 mm (0.0098–0.0236 in) wide at the base of the plant. The flowers are arranged in spikes or corymbs on a peduncle 170–640 mm (6.7–25.2 in) long. The bracteoles are lance-shaped, 5–12 mm (0.20–0.47 in) long and 1–3 mm (0.039–0.118 in) wide, sometimes with scattered, golden hairs. The perianth is cream-coloured or blue, forming a tube 3.5–6 mm (0.14–0.24 in) long. The upper lip is egg-shaped, 2.0–3.5 mm (0.079–0.138 in) long and 2.0–2.5 mm (0.079–0.098 in) wide, the lower lip joined for 1.0–1.5 mm (0.039–0.059 in) long with narrowly oblong lobes 2–4 mm (0.079–0.157 in) long. Flowering depends on subspecies, and the fruit is a nut 2.0–2.6 mm (0.079–0.102 in) long and 1.5–2.0 mm (0.059–0.079 in) wide and orange, with velvety hairs.

== Taxonomy ==
Conospermum densiflorum was first formally described in 1839 by John Lindley in his A Sketch of the Vegetation of the Swan River Colony. The specific epithet (densiflorum) means 'dense-flowered'.

In 1995, Eleanor Marion Bennett described subsp. unicephalatum in the Flora of Australia, and the name, and that of the autonym are accepted by the Australian Plant Census:

- Conospermum densiflorum Lindl. subsp. densiflorum (the autonym) has flowers arranged in a corymb of spikes and flowers from September to December or January.
- Conospermum densiflorum subsp. unicephalatum E.M.Benn. has flowers arranged in a spike at the ends of branches and flowers from September to November.

== Distribution and habitat ==
Conospermum densiflorum subsp. densiflorum is widely distributed between Perth and Jurien Bay in the Avon Wheatbelt, Geraldton Sandplains and Jarrah Forest bioregions of south-western Western Australia where it is found in low-lying areas in gravelly-clay soils, often over laterite. Subspecies unicephalatum occurs between Gingin and Moora in the Avon Wheatbelt, Jarrah Forest and Swan Coastal Plain bioregions.

== Conservation status ==
Subspecies densiflorum is list as "not threatened" by the Government of Western Australia Department of Biodiversity, Conservation and Attractions, but subsp. unicephalatum is listed as threatened.
