= Marianthus coeruleopunctatus =

Blue-spotted marianthus

Scientific classification
- Kingdom: Plantae
- Clade: Tracheophytes
- Clade: Angiosperms
- Clade: Eudicots
- Clade: Asterids
- Order: Apiales
- Family: Pittosporaceae
- Genus: Marianthus
- Species: M. coeruleopunctatus

Binomial name
- Marianthus coeruleopunctatus Klotzsch

Synonyms
- Billardiera coeruleo-punctata (Klotzsch) E.M.Benn.; Pronaya pedunculosa Turcz.

Species of plant native to Australia

Marianthus coeruleopunctatus, commonly known as blue-spotted marianthus, is a species of flowering plant in the family Pittosporaceae and is endemic to the southwest of Western Australia. It is a twining shrub or climber with narrowly elliptic leaves and pale blue flowers sometimes with dark blue spots or lines, arranged in branched clusters.

== Description ==
Marianthus coeruleopunctatus is a twining shrub or climber with silky-hairy new stems. Its adult leaves are narrowly elliptic, 28–50 mm (1.1–2.0 in) long and 4–10 mm (0.16–0.39 in) wide and more or less sessile. The edges of the leaves are slightly thickened and turned downwards. The flowers are borne in branched clusters of up to 30 on a twining rachis 40–120 mm (1.6–4.7 in) long, the peduncles 10–15 mm (0.39–0.59 in) long. The sepals are linear, 4–5 mm (0.16–0.20 in) long and tinged with blue. The five petals are 11–15 mm (0.43–0.59 in) long and pale blue, sometimes with darker blue spots and lines. Flowering occurs in April and May or from October to December.

== Taxonomy ==
Marianthus coeruleopunctatus was first formally described in 1840 by Johann Friedrich Klotzsch in Icones Plantarum Rariorum Horti Regii Botanici Berolinensis. The specific epithet (coeruleopunctatus) means "blue-dotted".

== Distribution and habitat ==
Blue-spotted marianthus grows in woodland and forest near Perth, extending as far north as Mount Lesueur and as far east as Northam, in the Avon Wheatbelt, Geraldton Sandplains, Jarrah Forest and Swan Coastal Plain bioregions of south-western Western Australia.

== Conservation status ==
Marianthus coeruleopunctatus is listed as "not threatened" by the Government of Western Australia Department of Biodiversity, Conservation and Attractions.
