= Marianthus aquilonaris =

Conservation status
- Declared rare (DEC)

Scientific classification
- Kingdom: Plantae
- Clade: Tracheophytes
- Clade: Angiosperms
- Clade: Eudicots
- Clade: Asterids
- Order: Apiales
- Family: Pittosporaceae
- Genus: Marianthus
- Species: M. aquilonaris

Binomial name
- Marianthus aquilonaris N.Gibson & Wege

Synonyms
- Billardiera sp. nov. (NG & ML 1776); Marianthus sp. Bremer (N.Gibson & M.Lyons 1776) WA Herbarium

Species of plant native to Australia

Marianthus aquilonaris is a species of flowering plant in the family Pittosporaceae and is endemic to a restricted part of the southwest of Western Australia. It is an erect, multi-stemmed shrub with elliptic to oblong leaves and pale blue to almost white flowers arranged singly in leaf axils.

== Description ==
Marianthus aquilonaris is an erect, multi-stemmed shrub that typically grows to 0.3–1.6 m (1 ft 0 in – 5 ft 3 in) high and 0.15–1 m (5.9 in – 3 ft 3.4 in) wide. Its adult leaves are elliptic to oblong, 7–22 mm (0.28–0.87 in) long and 2.3–7.0 mm (0.091–0.276 in) wide on a petiole 1.0–2.5 mm (0.039–0.098 in) long. Both surfaces of the mature leaves are more or less glabrous. The flowers are borne singly in leaf axils on a peduncle 3–12 mm (0.12–0.47 in) long covered with glandular hairs. The sepals are 3–7 mm (0.12–0.28 in) long and the five petals are pale blue to almost white, spatula-shaped, 11.0–19.5 mm (0.43–0.77 in) long and joined at the base, the lobes turned back. Flowering mainly occurs in September and October.

== Taxonomy ==
Marianthus aquilonaris was first formally described in 2009 by Neil Gibson and Juliet Wege from specimens collected in the Bremer Range in 1994. The specific epithet (aquilonaris) means "northern", referring to the distribution of this species compared to the similar M. mollis.

== Distribution and habitat ==
This species of shrub grows in open woodland on sandy loam over laterite on rock outcrops and slopes, and is restricted to the Bremer Range in the Coolgardie bioregion of inland Western Australia.

== Conservation status ==
Marianthus aquilonaris is listed as "Threatened" by the Government of Western Australia Department of Parks and Wildlife and an interim recovery plan has been prepared. The main threats to the species include mining exploration, vehicle movement and track maintenance, and inappropriate fire regimes.

== See also ==
- Megachile lucifer
