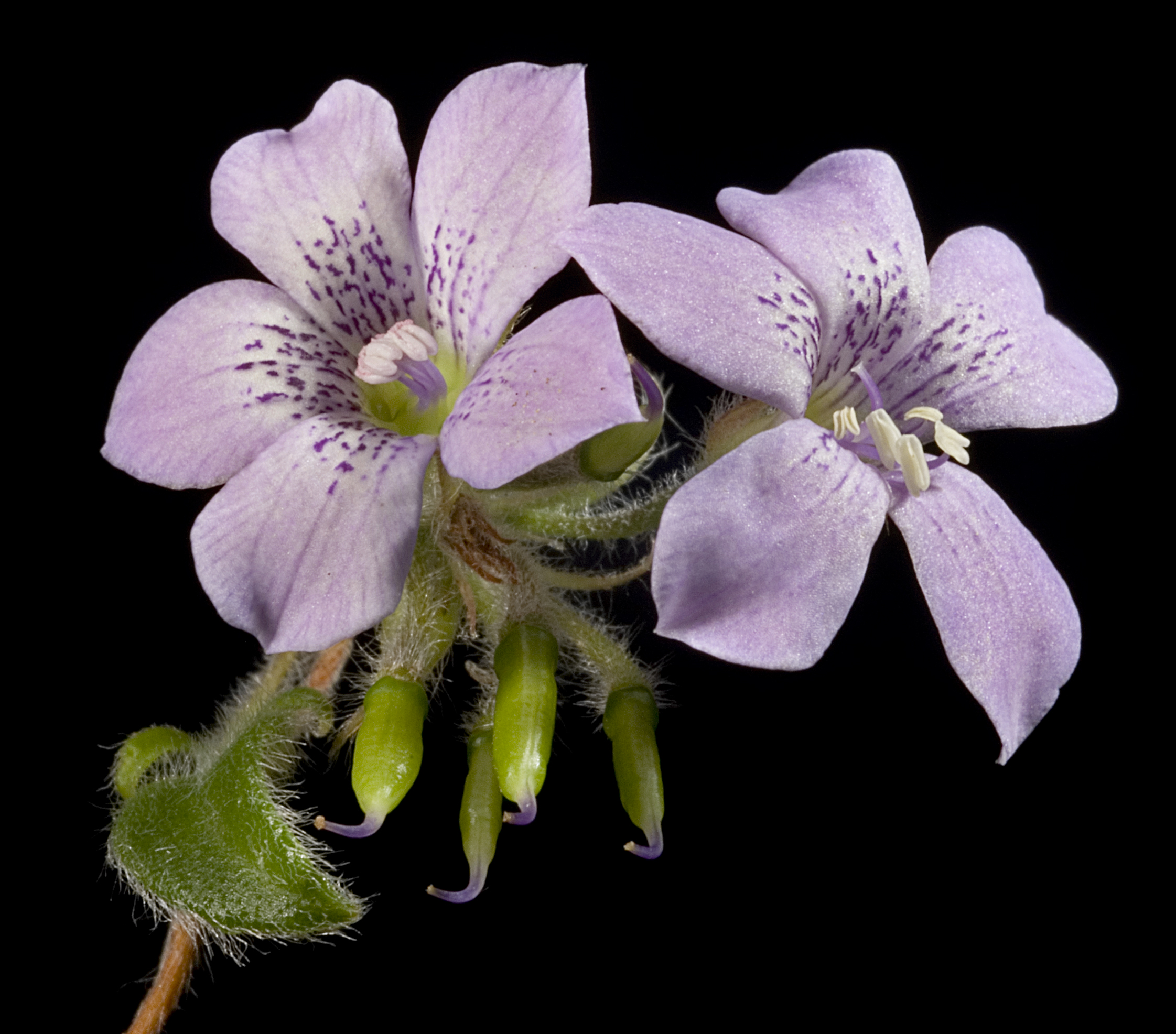

Scientific classification
- Kingdom: Plantae
- Clade: Tracheophytes
- Clade: Angiosperms
- Clade: Eudicots
- Clade: Asterids
- Order: Apiales
- Family: Pittosporaceae
- Genus: Marianthus
- Species: M. tenuis

Binomial name
- Marianthus tenuis Benth.

Synonyms
- Billardiera parviflora DC.; Billardiera parviflora var. guttata E.M.Benn.; Billardiera parviflora DC. var. parviflora; Marianthus gracilis Ostenf.

= Marianthus tenuis =

Species of plant native to Australia

Marianthus tenuis is a species of flowering plant in the family Pittosporaceae and is endemic to the southwest of Western Australia. It is a slender, twining shrub with clustered, narrowly elliptic leaves and white flowers tinged with mauve and with darker spots on three of the five petals.

== Description ==
Marianthus tenuis is slender, twining shrub with silky-hairy new shoots. Its adult leaves are narrowly elliptic and clustered, 15–34 mm (0.59–1.34 in) long and 4–7 mm (0.16–0.28 in) wide. The flowers are borne in small groups on a peduncle 12–15 mm (0.47–0.59 in) long, each flower on a pedicel less than 5 mm (0.20 in) long. The sepals are silky-hairy and about 4 mm (0.16 in) long. The five petals are white with a mauve tinge, 10–12 mm (0.39–0.47 in) long and about 2.7 mm (0.11 in) wide. Three of the petals develop darker spots as they age. Flowering occurs in November or from January to June with a peak from March to April. The fruit is an elliptic capsule 8–9 mm (0.31–0.35 in) long and about 5 mm (0.20 in) in diameter.

== Taxonomy ==
Marianthus tenuis was first formally described in 1863 by George Bentham in Flora Australiensis. The specific epithet (tenuis) means "thin, fine or slender".

The name Marianthus tenuis is a replaced synonym of de Candolle's Billardiera parviflora, described in his 1824 Prodromus Systematis Naturalis Regni Vegetabilis.

== Distribution and habitat ==
Marianthus tenuis grows in open coastal heath on limestone and in woodland on laterite south from the Darling Range in the Avon Wheatbelt, Jarrah Forest, Swan Coastal Plain and Warren bioregions of south-western Western Australia.

== Conservation status ==
This marianthus is listed as "not threatened" by the Government of Western Australia Department of Biodiversity, Conservation and Attractions.
