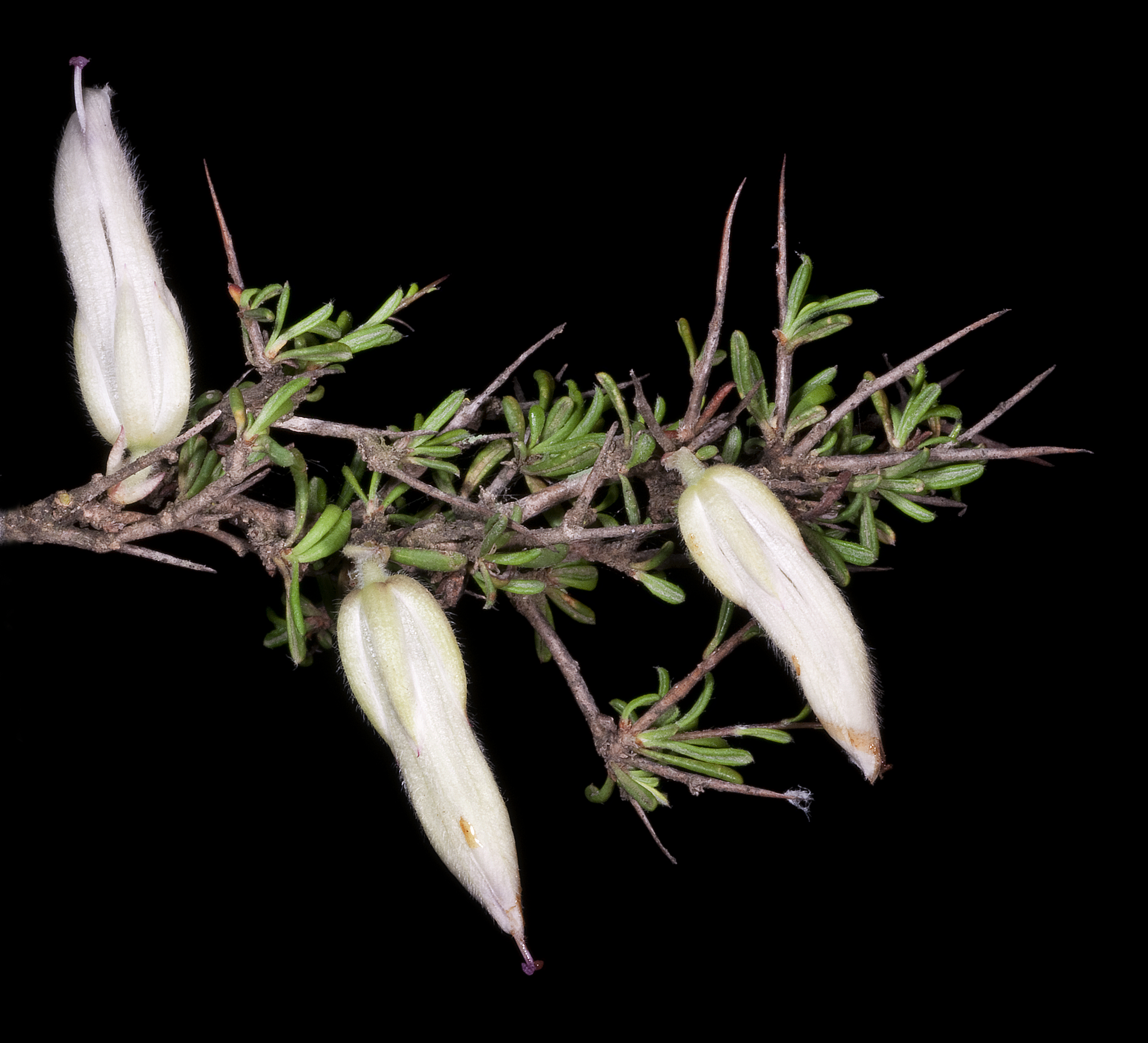

Scientific classification
- Kingdom: Plantae
- Clade: Tracheophytes
- Clade: Angiosperms
- Clade: Eudicots
- Clade: Asterids
- Order: Apiales
- Family: Pittosporaceae
- Genus: Bentleya; E.M.Benn.

= Bentleya =

Genus of flowering plants

Bentleya is a genus of flowering plants belonging to the family Pittosporaceae.

Its native range is Western Australia.

Species:

- Bentleya spinescens E.M.Benn.
