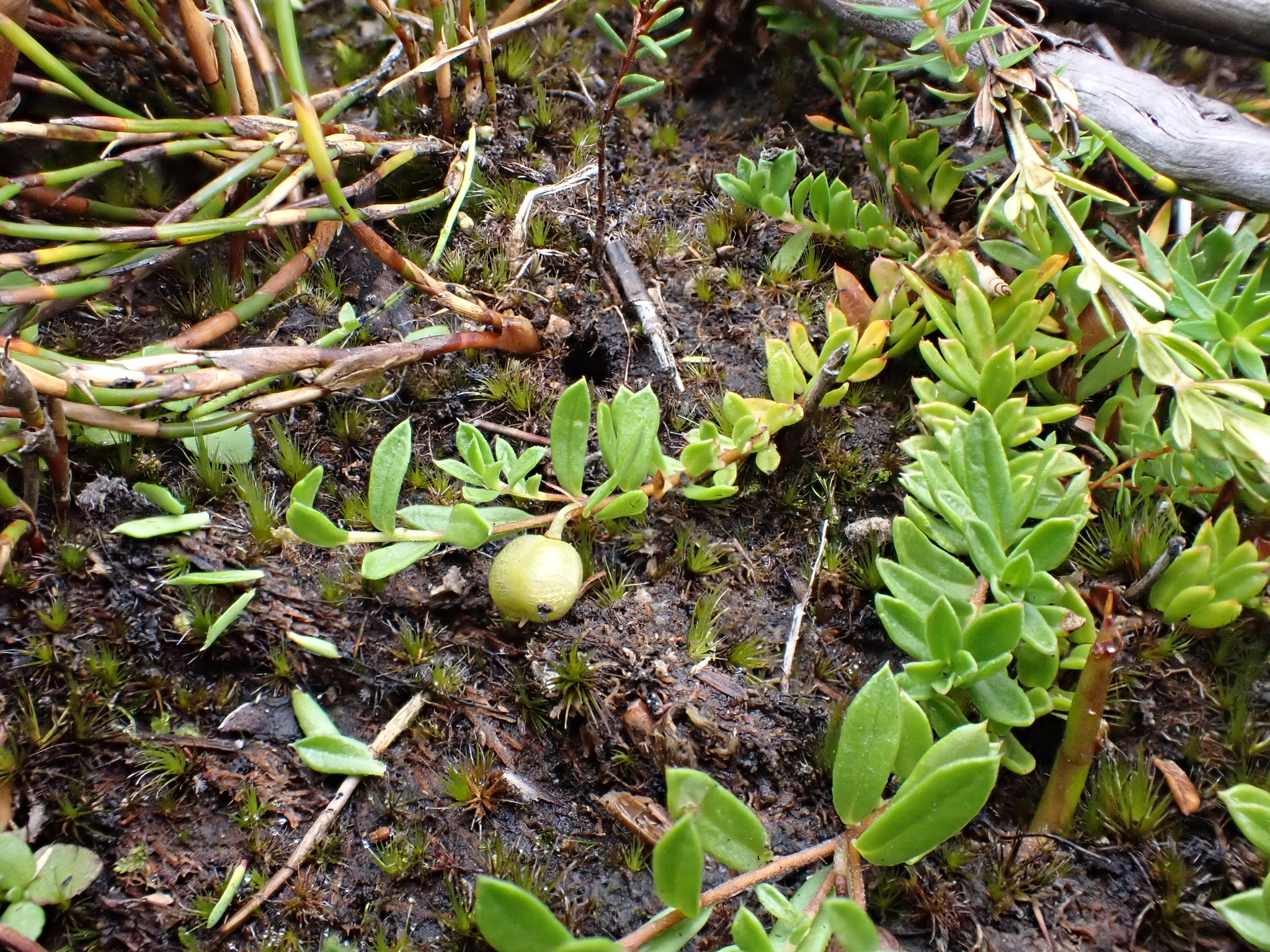

Scientific classification
- Kingdom: Plantae
- Clade: Tracheophytes
- Clade: Angiosperms
- Clade: Eudicots
- Clade: Asterids
- Order: Apiales
- Family: Pittosporaceae
- Genus: Rhytidosporum
- Species: R. inconspicuum

Binomial name
- Rhytidosporum inconspicuum L.Cayzer, Crisp and I.Telford

= Rhytidosporum inconspicuum =

Species of plant

Rhytidosporum inconspicuum (common name alpine appleberry) is an inconspicuous, rhizomatous specios of shrub in the pittosporum family, Pittosporaceae. The species is found in New South Wales, Victoria and Tasmania.

The species was first formally described in 1999 by Lindy Cayzer, Michael Crisp and Ian Telford, when they published a revision of the genus, Rhytidosporum. The species epithet, inconspicuum, was given because the plant is inconspicuous when not in flower or fruit.

== Conservation status ==
It has been declared an "endangered species" under the Tasmanian Threatened Species Protection Act 1995 but has not been listed under the Commonwealth EPBC Act.

However, in New South Wales, it is said to be "common" in the one locality where it occurs.
