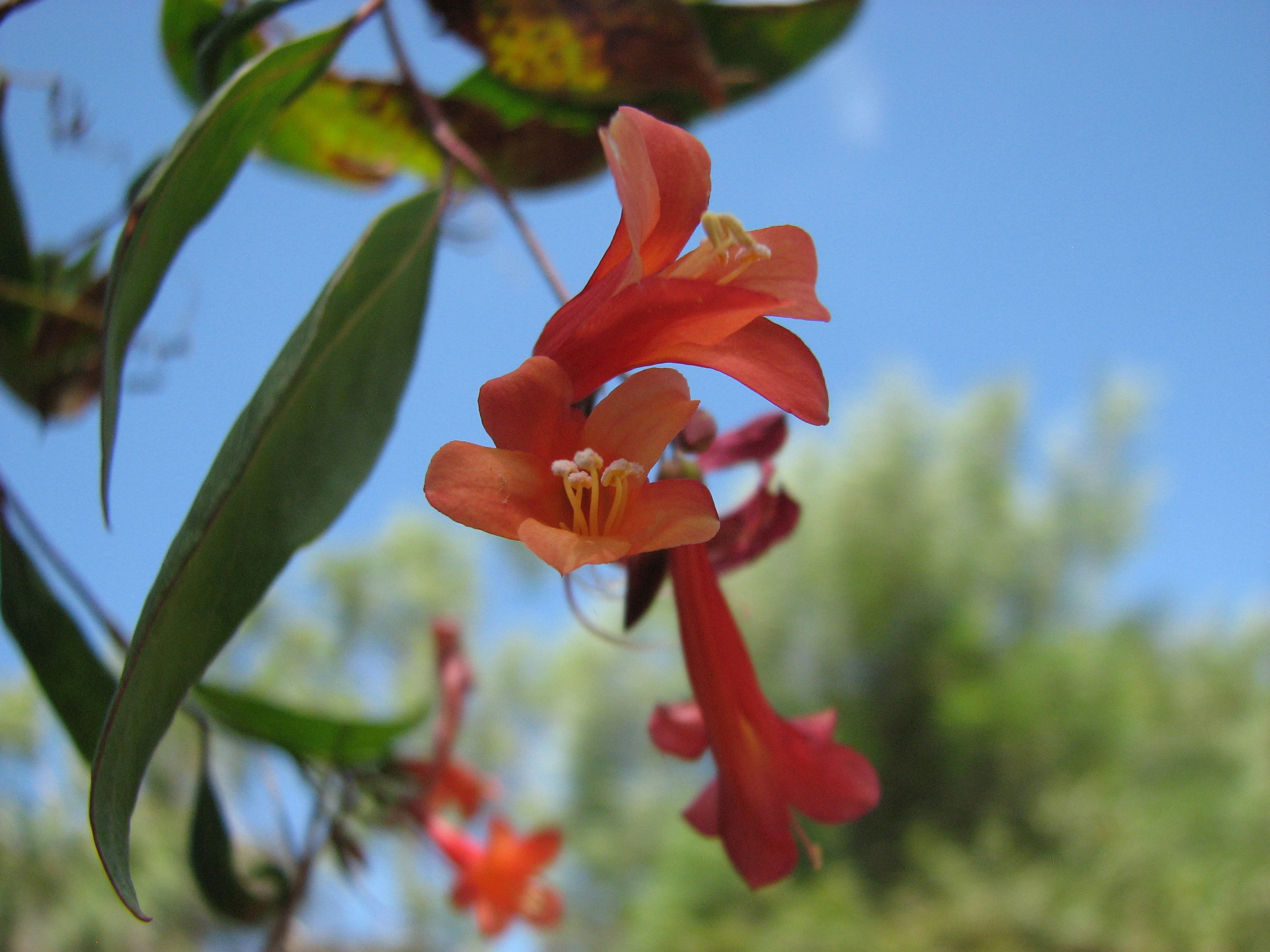
- Marianthus erubescens

Scientific classification
- Kingdom: Plantae
- Clade: Tracheophytes
- Clade: Angiosperms
- Clade: Eudicots
- Clade: Asterids
- Order: Apiales
- Family: Pittosporaceae
- Genus: Marianthus; Hügel ex Endl.

Synonyms
- List: Billardiera sect. Marianthus (Hügel ex Endl.) E.M.Benn.; Billardiera ser. Bignoniae E.M.Benn.; Billardiera ser. Calopetalae (Harv.) E.M.Benn.; Billardiera ser. Oncosporeae (Benth.) E.M.Benn.; Billardiera ser. Parviflorae E.M.Benn.; Billardiera ser. Pictae (Benth.) E.M.Benn.; Billardiera ser. Procumbentes (Benth.) E.M.Benn.; Calopetalon Harv.; Calopetalum Benth. orth. var.; Marianthus sect. Granularia Kuntze; Marianthus ser. Normales Benth. nom. inval.; Marianthus ser. Oncosporeae Benth.; Marianthus ser. Pictae Benth.; Marianthus ser. Procumbentes Benth.; Oncosporum Putt. nom. illeg., nom. superfl.; Oncosporum Putt.

= Marianthus =

Genus of flowering plants

Marianthus is a genus of flowering plants in the family Pittosporaceae and is endemic to Australia. Plants in the genus Marianthus are shrubs with twining branches, simple leaves arranged alternately along the stems. The flowers are pendent, arranged singly or in small groups in upper leaf axils or on the ends of branches with small bracts and bracteoles at the base, but that fall as the flowers open. The sepals are free from each other, and the petals are also sometimes free from each, otherwise joined at the base, forming a tube with spreading lobes. Plants in this genus were previously included in Billardiera, but have a stalked ovary and a long, usually curved style. The fruit is a dehiscent capsule containing many seeds.

The genus Marianthus was first originally established in 1837 by Stephan Endlicher in his Enumeratio plantarum quas in Novae Hollandiae ora austro-occidentali ad fluvium Cygnorum et in sinu Regis Georgii collegit Carolus Liber Baro de Hügel, and the first species he described (the type species) was M. candidus. In 1972, Eleanor Marion Bennett combined the genera Billardiera and Marianthus in Billardiera, in the journal Nuytsia, so that Marianthus became a synonym of Billardiera. The name Marianthus means "Virgin Mary-flower", on account of the white colour of M. candidus, the first species in the genus to be described.

In 2004, Marianthus was resurrected from synonymy by Lindy Cayzer and Mike Crisp in the journal Australian Systematic Botany, and the name is accepted by the Australian Plant Census.

The following is a list of Marianthus species accepted by the Australian Plant Census as of June 2023:

- Marianthus aquilonaris N.Gibson & Wege
- Marianthus bicolor (Putt.) F.Muell. - painted marianthus
- Marianthus bignoniaceus F.Muell. - orange bell-climber
- Marianthus candidus Hügel ex Endl. - white marianthus
- Marianthus coeruleopunctatus Klotzsch - blue-spotted marianthus
- Marianthus drummondianus (Putt.) Benth.
- Marianthus dryandra L.W.Cayzer & Crisp
- Marianthus erubescens Putt.
- Marianthus granulatus (Turcz.) Benth.
- Marianthus microphyllus (Turcz.) Benth.
- Marianthus mollis (E.M.Benn.) L.W.Cayzer & Crisp - hairy-fruited billardiera
- Marianthus paralius L.W.Cayzer & Crisp
- Marianthus ringens (Drumm. ex Harv.) F.Muell.
- Marianthus sylvaticus L.W.Cayzer & Crisp
- Marianthus tenuis Benth.
