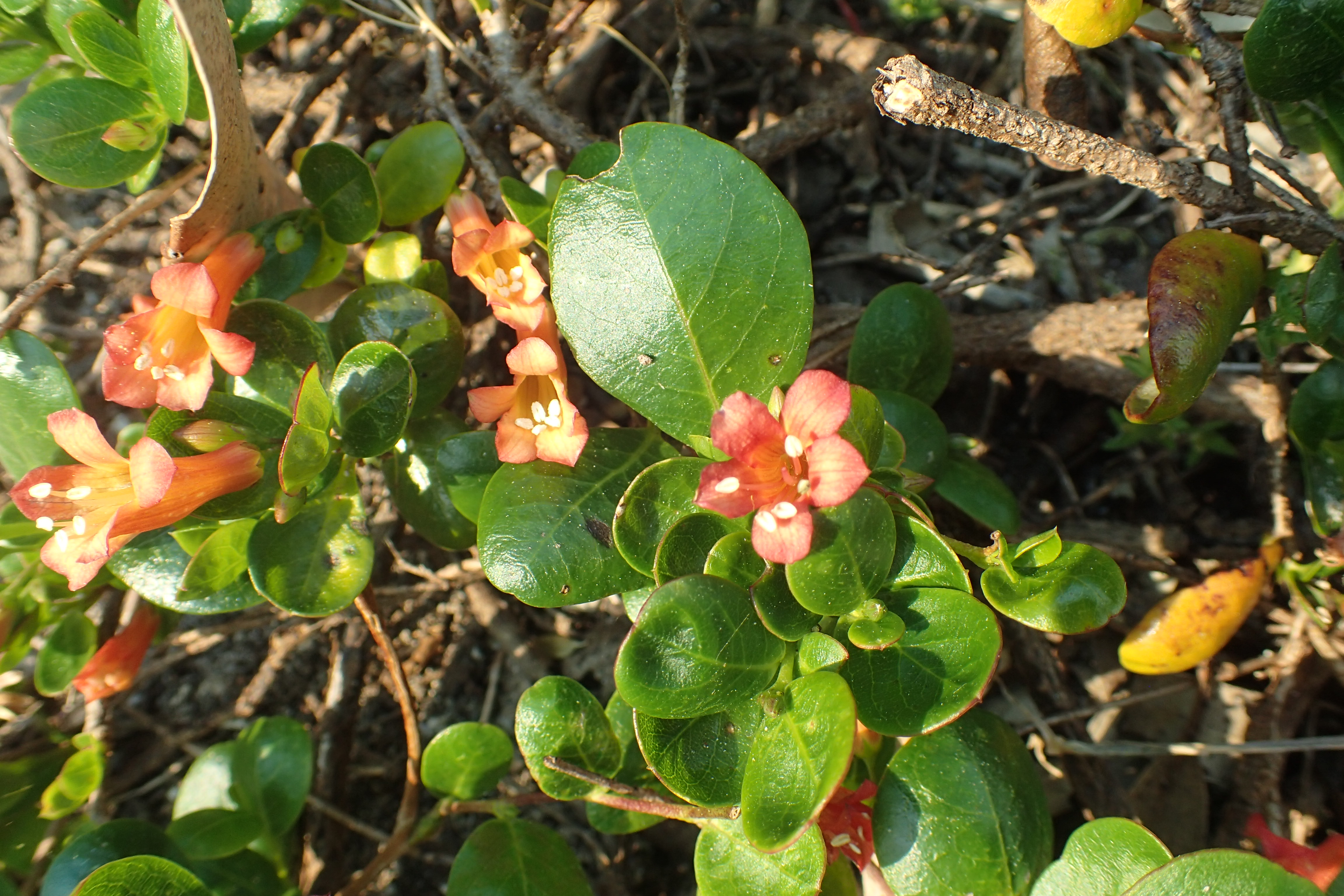
- In Kings Park, Perth

Conservation status
- Declared rare (DEC)

Scientific classification
- Kingdom: Plantae
- Clade: Tracheophytes
- Clade: Angiosperms
- Clade: Eudicots
- Clade: Asterids
- Order: Apiales
- Family: Pittosporaceae
- Genus: Marianthus
- Species: M. paralius

Binomial name
- Marianthus paralius L.W.Cayzer & Crisp

= Marianthus paralius =

Species of plant native to Australia

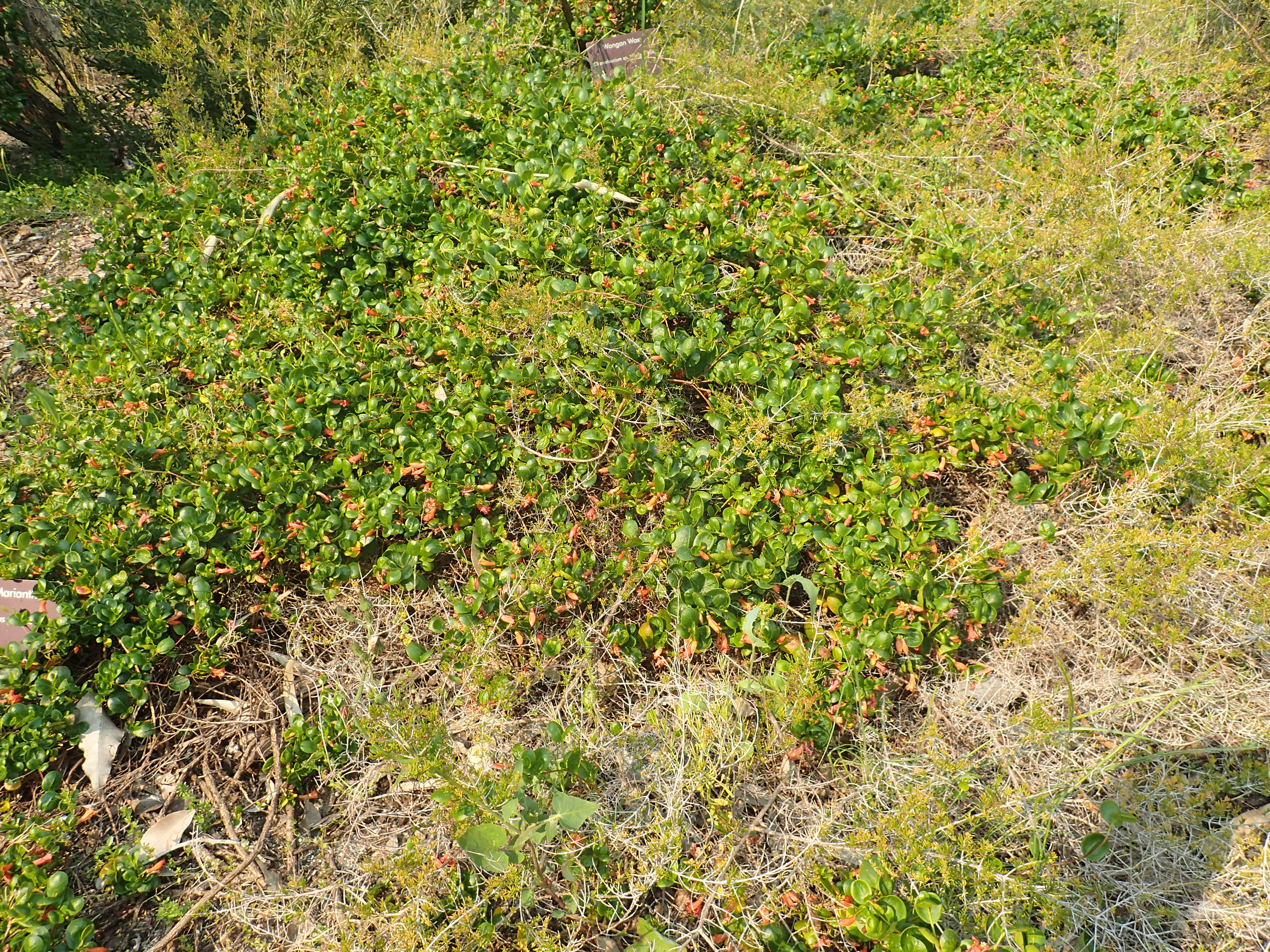
Habit

Marianthus paralius is a species of flowering plant in the family Pittosporaceae and is endemic to a restricted part of the southwest of Western Australia. It is a more or less prostrate shrub with thick, egg-shaped leaves and red flowers.

== Description ==
Marianthus paralius is a woody, more or less prostrate shrub that typically spreads to a diameter of up to 50 cm (20 in), and tends to become a climber as it ages. The leaves are egg-shaped and thick, the flowers red with white stamens. Flowering occurs from September to November.

== Taxonomy ==
Marianthus paralius was first formally described in 2004 by Lindy W. Cayzer and Michael Crisp in Australian Systematic Botany from specimens collected near Seabird. The specific epithet (paralius) means "by the sea".

== Distribution and habitat ==
This species of shrub grows in white sand over limestone on low coastal cliffs and is only known from two locations north of Perth in the Gingin and Joondalup local Government areas.

== Conservation status ==
Marianthus paralius is listed "Threatened" by the Government of Western Australia Department of Parks and Wildlife and an interim recovery plan has been prepared. The main threats to the species include mining activities, grazing by rabbits, recreational activities, weed invasion and inappropriate fire regimes.
