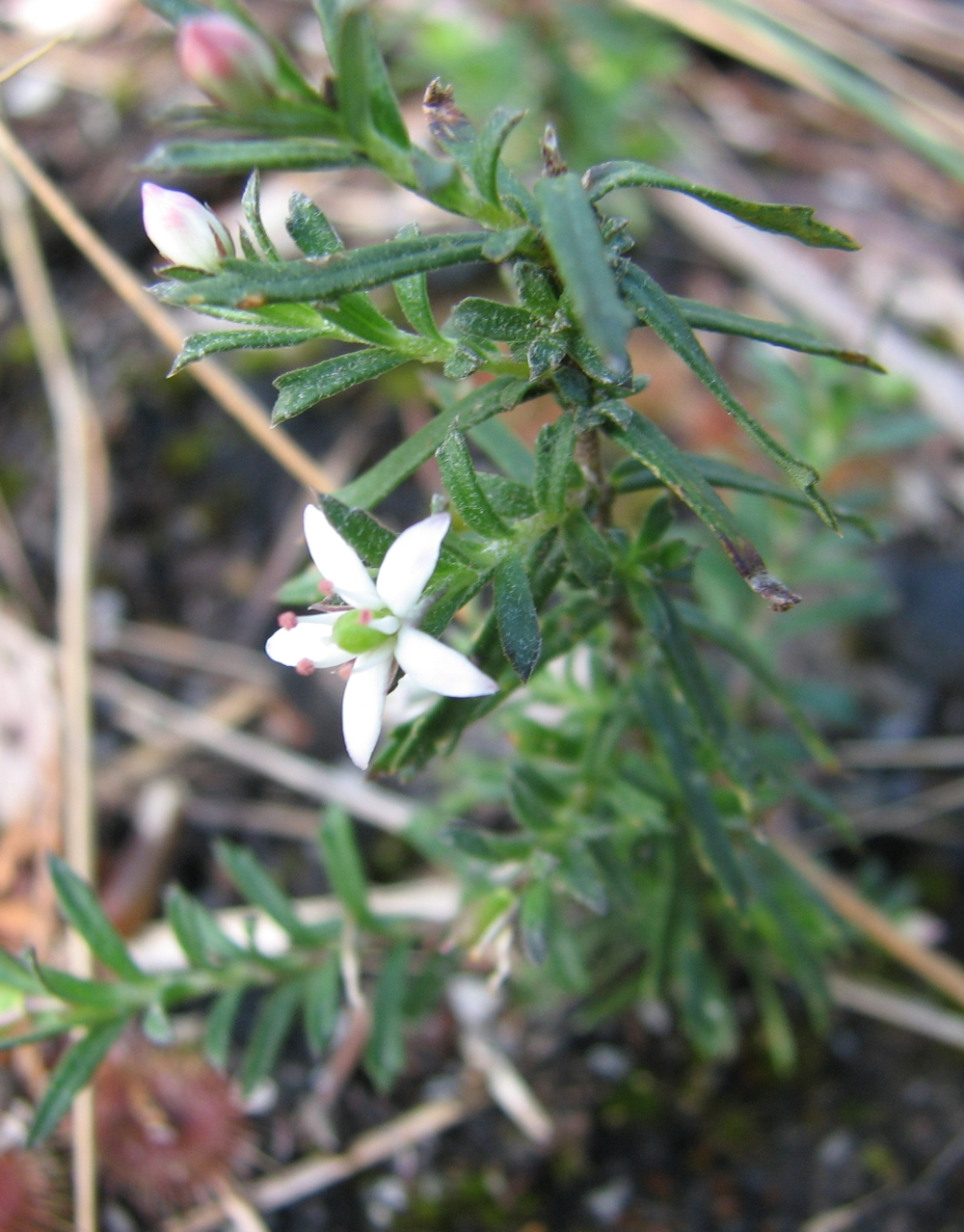
- Rhytidosporum procumbens

Scientific classification
- Kingdom: Plantae
- Clade: Tracheophytes
- Clade: Angiosperms
- Clade: Eudicots
- Clade: Asterids
- Order: Apiales
- Family: Pittosporaceae
- Genus: Rhytidosporum; F.Muell.

Species
- See text

= Rhytidosporum =

Genus of flowering plants

Rhytidosporum is a genus of flowering plants within the family Pittosporaceae. The type species is Rhytidosporum procumbens (Hook.) F.Muell.

== Description ==
Rhytidosporum species are generally small herbs, or low shrubs, with alternate leaves which are often toothed at the apex. The flowers are small, generally solitary, and occur both in the axils and terminally. The five equal petals are white often tinged with red. The anthers shed their pollen longitudinally. The capsule is stalkless, with generally two locules. The seeds are dry, wrinkled and wingless.

There are five species, which are endemic to Australia:

- Rhytidosporum alpinum McGill.
- Rhytidosporum diosmoides (Putt.) L.Cayzer, Crisp & I.Telford
- Rhytidosporum inconspicuum L.Cayzer, Crisp & I.Telford
- Rhytidosporum procumbens (Hook.) F.Muell. - White marianth
- Rhytidosporum prostratum McGill.
