= Marianthus sylvaticus =

Scientific classification
- Kingdom: Plantae
- Clade: Tracheophytes
- Clade: Angiosperms
- Clade: Eudicots
- Clade: Asterids
- Order: Apiales
- Family: Pittosporaceae
- Genus: Marianthus
- Species: M. sylvaticus

Binomial name
- Marianthus sylvaticus L.W.Cayzer & Crisp

Species of plant native to Australia

Marianthus sylvaticus is a species of flowering plant in the family Pittosporaceae and is endemic to a small area in the southwest of Western Australia. It is a slender climber with clustered, toothed, linear leaves and blue and white flowers with purple veins.

== Description ==
Marianthus sylvaticus is a slender climber that has sparsely hairy, reddish brown stems with prominent lenticels. The adult leaves are clustered, linear, 50–85 mm (2.0–3.3 in) long and 4–6 mm (0.16–0.24 in) wide on a petiole 5–10 mm (0.20–0.39 in) long and have toothed edges. The flowers are borne singly in branched umbels on a twining peduncle 30–85 mm (1.2–3.3 in) long, the individual flowers on a pedicel 10–12 mm (0.39–0.47 in) long. The sepals are linear, 2–3 mm (0.079–0.118 in) long and fall off as the flowers mature. The five petals are white with purple veins on the outside, blue inside, elliptic and 10–12 mm (0.39–0.47 in) long. Flowering mainly occurs in April and May.

== Taxonomy ==
Marianthus sylvaticus was first formally described in 2004 by Lindy W. Cayzer and Michael Crisp in Australian Systematic Botany from specimens collected in the Walpole-Nornalup National Park. The specific epithet (sylvaticus) means "pertaining to a forest or wood".

== Distribution and habitat ==
This species of shrub grows in tall forest and is only known from near Walpole in the Jarrah Forest and Warren bioregions of south-western Western Australia.

== Conservation status ==
Marianthus sylvaticus is listed "not threatened" by the Government of Western Australia Department of Biodiversity, Conservation and Attractions.
