= Marianthus dryandra =

Conservation status
- Priority Two — Poorly Known Taxa (DEC)

Scientific classification
- Kingdom: Plantae
- Clade: Tracheophytes
- Clade: Angiosperms
- Clade: Eudicots
- Clade: Asterids
- Order: Apiales
- Family: Pittosporaceae
- Genus: Marianthus
- Species: M. dryandra

Binomial name
- Marianthus dryandra L.W.Cayzer & Crisp

Synonyms
- Billardiera sp. Dryandra (D.M.Rose 397)

Species of plant native to Australia

Marianthus dryandra is a species of flowering plant in the family Pittosporaceae and is endemic to a restricted area in the southwest of Western Australia. It is an erect, straggling shrub with densely hairy new shoots, stem-clasping, egg-shaped leaves and cream-coloured flowers with maroon spots, arranged on short side shoots.

== Description ==
Marianthus dryandra is an erect, scrambling shrub that typically grows to a height of up to 40 cm (16 in) and has densely hairy new shoots. Its leaves are egg-shaped with the narrower end towards the base, 12–15 mm (0.47–0.59 in) long, about 7 mm (0.28 in) wide and stem-clasping. The flowers are borne singly on short side shoots on a peduncle less than 10 mm (0.39 in) long. The sepals are linear, greenish-purple and hairy, about 3.5 mm (0.14 in) long. The five petals are 6–10 mm (0.24–0.39 in) long and cream-coloured with maroon spots along the veins. Flowering has been observed in October.

== Taxonomy ==
Marianthus dryandra was first formally described in 2004 by Lindy Cayzer and Michael Crisp in Australian Systematic Botany from specimens collected in the Dryandra State Forest. The specific epithet (dryandra) refers to the type location, the only known habitat of this species.

== Distribution and habitat ==
This species of marianthus is only known from the type collection where it grows in woodland.

== Conservation status ==
Marianthus dryandra is listed as "Priority Two" by the Western Australian Government Department of Biodiversity, Conservation and Attractions, meaning that it is poorly known and from only one or a few locations.
