= Xerosollya =

Scientific classification
- Kingdom: Plantae
- Clade: Tracheophytes
- Clade: Angiosperms
- Clade: Eudicots
- Clade: Asterids
- Order: Apiales
- Family: Pittosporaceae
- Genus: Xerosollya; Turcz.

Genus of flowering plants

Xerosollya is a genus of flowering plants belonging to the family Pittosporaceae.

Its native range is Western Australia.

Species:

- Xerosollya gilbertii Turcz.
