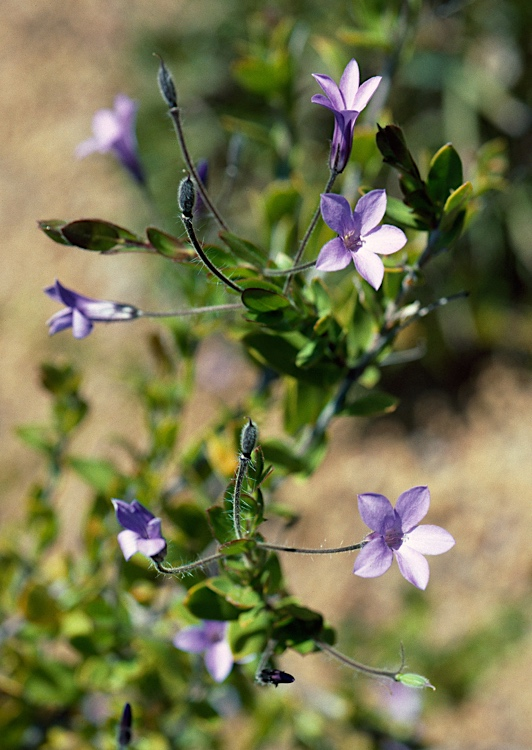
- In Kings Park, Perth

Conservation status
- Priority Four — Rare Taxa (DEC)

Scientific classification
- Kingdom: Plantae
- Clade: Tracheophytes
- Clade: Angiosperms
- Clade: Eudicots
- Clade: Asterids
- Order: Apiales
- Family: Pittosporaceae
- Genus: Marianthus
- Species: M. mollis

Binomial name
- Marianthus mollis (E.M.Benn.) L.W.Cayzer & Crisp

Synonyms
- Billardiera mollis E.M.Benn.

= Marianthus mollis =

Species of plant native to Australia

Marianthus mollis, commonly known as hairy-fruited billardiera, is a species of flowering plant in the family Pittosporaceae and is endemic to a small region in the southwest of Western Australia. It is an erect, spreading, silky-hairy shrub with sessile, egg-shaped leaves and purplish-blue flowers arranged singly in leaf axils.

== Description ==
Marianthus mollis is an erect, spreading, silky-hairy shrub that typically grows to a height of 50–60 cm (20–24 in), the stems usually obscured by the leaves. Its leaves are sessile, egg-shaped, 10–20 mm (0.39–0.79 in) long and 7–11 mm (0.28–0.43 in) wide and often have a reddish border. The flowers are borne singly in leaf axils on a hairy peduncle 18–25 mm (0.71–0.98 in) long. The sepals are 3–5 mm (0.12–0.20 in) long, dark blue and hairy. The five petals are purplish-blue, spatula-shaped and joined at the base, 10–18 mm (0.39–0.71 in) long with fine purple striations that darken as the flowers age. Flowering occurs in August and September.

== Taxonomy ==
This species was first formally described in 1983 by Eleanor Marion Bennett, who gave it the name Billardiera mollis in the journal Nuytsia, from specimens she collected on the "north-east slope of the southern ridge of the Ravensthorpe Range" in 1979. In 2004, Lindy Cayzer and Michael Crisp transferred the species to Marianthus as M. mollis in Australian Systematic Botany. The specific epithet (mollis) means "soft".

== Distribution and habitat ==
Marianthus mollis is only known from the area near where the type collection was made, where it grows in open mallee and tall shrubland in the Esperance Plains bioregion of south-western Western Australia.

== Conservation status ==
Marianthus mollis is listed as "Priority Four" by the Government of Western Australia Department of Biodiversity, Conservation and Attractions, meaning that it is rare or near threatened.
