= Eleanor Marion Bennett =

Botanist

- Born: 4 February 1942 (age 84); Subiaco, Western Australia
- Citizenship: Australian
- Education: The University of Western Australia
- Scientific career
- Fields: botany
- Author abbrev. (botany): E.M.Benn.

Eleanor Marion Bennett (born 4 February 1942) (née Scrymgeour) is an Australian botanist who was employed by the Western Australian Herbarium from 1965 to 1970. She collected Eucalyptus species in the south-west of Western Australia and published a revision of the genus Hybanthus in 1972. She is the author of two books: Bushland Plants of Kings Park, Western Australia and Common and aboriginal names of Western Australian plant species. Bennett was also one of the authors of Flora of the Perth region.

== Bibliography ==
- Bennett, E. M. (1972). "A revision of the Australian species of Hybanthus Jacquin (Violaceae)". Nuytsia. 1 (3): 218–241. doi:10.58828/nuy00007.
- Bennett, E. M. (1988). The Bushland Plants of Kings Park, Western Australia. Perth: Kings Park Publications. ISBN 0-7316-5031-X.
- Bennett, E. M. (1991). Common and Aboriginal Names of Western Australian Plant Species. Glen Forrest: Wildflower Society of Western Australia, Eastern Hills Branch.
- Bennett, E. M. (1992). "Plants Collected by J.A.L. Preiss from Kings Park in 1839". The Western Australian Naturalist. 19 (1): 17–21.
- Bennett, E. M. (1995). "Plant Species of the Kings Park Bushland". The Western Australian Naturalist. 20 (2): 97–118.
- Marchant, N. G., Wheeler, J. R., Rye, B. L., Bennett, E. M., Lander, N. S. & Macfarlane, T. D. (1987). Flora of the Perth Region. 2 vols. Perth: Western Australian Herbarium.
- Hall, N. (1978). Botanists of the Eucalypts. Melbourne: Commonwealth Scientific and Industrial Research Organisation.
