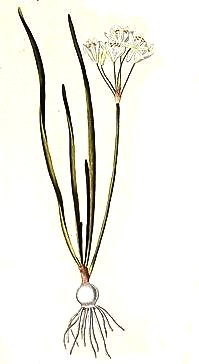
- Nothoscordum striatum
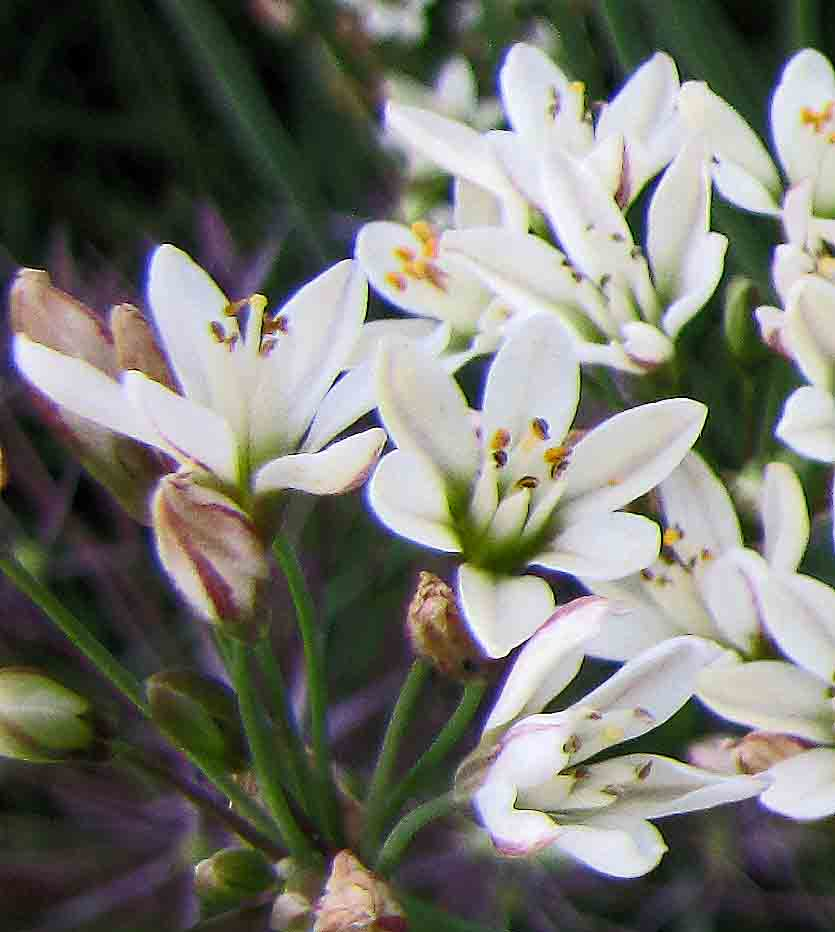
- Nothoscordum gracile

Scientific classification
- Kingdom: Plantae
- Clade: Tracheophytes
- Clade: Angiosperms
- Clade: Monocots
- Order: Asparagales
- Family: Amaryllidaceae
- Subfamily: Allioideae
- Tribe: Gilliesieae
- Genus: Nothoscordum; Kunth (1843), nom. cons.

Synonyms
- Beauverdia Herter (1943); Hesperocles Salisb. (1855); Oligosma Salisb. (1866); Pseudoscordum Herb. (1837)

= Nothoscordum =

Genus of flowering plants

Nothoscordum is a genus of New World plants in the onion tribe within the Amaryllis family. It is probably paraphyletic. The genus is native to North, Central and South America, though a few species have become naturalized in various parts of the Old World.

Nothoscordum is a conserved name. It's synonymous with Pseudoscordum, which was described in 1837 by William Herbert as a reclassification of some Allium species. The term Nothoscordum comes from the fourth volume of Carl Sigismund Kunth's work Enum. Pl., published six years later in 1843.

== Species ==
Plants of the World Online accepts 91 species, although other authorities suggest only 20.

1. Nothoscordum achalense Ravenna - Córdoba in Argentina
2. Nothoscordum albitractum Ravenna - Jujuy in Argentina
3. Nothoscordum altillanense Ravenna & Biurrun - La Rioja in Argentina
4. Nothoscordum andicola Kunth - Peru, Bolivia, northern Chile, northern Argentina
5. Nothoscordum aparadense Ravenna - Santa Catarina in Brazil
6. Nothoscordum arenarium Herter - northern Argentina, Uruguay
7. Nothoscordum auratum Ravenna - Uruguay
8. Nothoscordum bahiense Ravenna - Bahia in Brazil
9. Nothoscordum balaenense Ravenna - Uruguay
10. Nothoscordum basalticum Ravenna - Corrientes in Argentina
11. Nothoscordum bivalve (L.) Britton in N.L.Britton & A.Brown - southern half of United States from California to Virginia, Mexico, Colombia, Peru, Argentina, Chile, Uruguay
12. Nothoscordum boliviense Ravenna - Bolivia, northern Argentina
13. Nothoscordum bonariense (Pers.) Beauverd - northern Argentina, Uruguay, southern Brazil
14. Nothoscordum × borbonicum Kunth - northern Argentina (N. entrerianum × N. gracile)
15. Nothoscordum calcaense Ravenna - Peru
16. Nothoscordum calderense Ravenna - Salta in Argentina
17. Nothoscordum cambarense Ravenna - Rio Grande do Sul in Brazil
18. Nothoscordum capivarinum Ravenna - Paraná in Brazil
19. Nothoscordum carambolense Ravenna - Corrientes in Argentina
20. Nothoscordum catharinense Ravenna - Santa Catarina in Brazil
21. Nothoscordum clevelandicum Ravenna - Paraná in Brazil
22. Nothoscordum collinum Ravenna - Rio Grande do Sul in Brazil
23. Nothoscordum conostylum Ravenna - Entre Ríos in Argentina
24. Nothoscordum correntinum Ravenna - Corrientes in Argentina
25. Nothoscordum curvipes Ravenna - Paraná in Brazil
26. Nothoscordum cuyanum Ravenna - San Juan + Mendoza in Argentina
27. Nothoscordum demissum Ravenna - Cusco in Peru
28. Nothoscordum dialystemon (Guagl.) Crosa – Rio Grande do Sul in southern Brazil to Uruguay and northeastern Argentina
29. Nothoscordum dynamiandrum Ravenna - Jujuy in Argentina
30. Nothoscordum empedradense Ravenna - Corrientes in Argentina
31. Nothoscordum entrerianum Ravenna - Entre Ríos in Argentina
32. Nothoscordum exile Ravenna - Paraná in Brazil
33. Nothoscordum famatinense Ravenna - La Rioja in Argentina
34. Nothoscordum felipponei Beauverd – Uruguay and northern Buenos Aires Province in Argentina
35. Nothoscordum gaudichaudianum Kunth - Uruguay, Entre Ríos in Argentina
36. Nothoscordum gibbatum Ravenna – Santa Catarina state in Brazil
37. Nothoscordum glareosum Ravenna - Corrientes in Argentina
38. Nothoscordum gracile (Aiton) Stearn - widespread from southern Mexico to Chile; naturalized in southeastern United States, California, and scattered locations in Europe, Asia, Africa, Australia, and various oceanic islands
39. Nothoscordum gracilipes Ravenna - southern Brazil
40. Nothoscordum hirtellum (Kunth) Herter – southern Brazil, northeastern Argentina, and Uruguay
41. Nothoscordum ibiramense Ravenna - Santa Catarina in southern Brazil
42. Nothoscordum ineanum Ravenna - Chaco in Argentina
43. Nothoscordum inundatum Ravenna - Corrientes in Argentina
44. Nothoscordum itapetinga Campos-Rocha & Sassone – São Paulo state in Brazil
45. Nothoscordum ipacarainum Ravenna - Paraguay
46. Nothoscordum itatiense Ravenna - Corrientes in Argentina
47. Nothoscordum jaibanum Ravenna - Minas Gerais in Brazil
48. Nothoscordum leptogynum Ravenna - Rio Grande do Sul in Brazil
49. Nothoscordum luteomajus Ravenna - Paraná in Brazil
50. Nothoscordum luteominus Ravenna - Buenos Aires Province in Argentina
51. Nothoscordum macrantherum (Kuntze) Beauverd - Paraguay
52. Nothoscordum mahui Traub - Santiago Region in Chile
53. Nothoscordum marchesii Crosa – Rio Grande do Sul in southern Brazil
54. Nothoscordum moconense Ravenna - Misiones in Argentina
55. Nothoscordum modestum Ravenna - Paraguay
56. Nothoscordum montevidense Beauverd - Uruguay, northern Argentina, southern Brazil
57. Nothoscordum muscorum Ravenna – Rio Grande do Sul in southern Brazil
58. Nothoscordum nublense Ravenna - Biobío in Chile
59. Nothoscordum nudicaule (Lehm.) Guagl. - Uruguay, Bolivia, Argentina, southern Brazil
60. Nothoscordum nudum Beauverd - Uruguay, Entre Ríos in Argentina
61. Nothoscordum nutans Ravenna - Paraná in Brazil
62. Nothoscordum ostenii Beauverd – Buenos Aires Province in Argentina
63. Nothoscordum pachyrhizum Ravenna - Uruguay
64. Nothoscordum paradoxum Ravenna - Uruguay
65. Nothoscordum patricium Ravenna - Corrientes in Argentina
66. Nothoscordum pedersenii Ravenna - Corrientes in Argentina
67. Nothoscordum pernambucanum Ravenna - eastern Brazil
68. Nothoscordum planifolium Ravenna - Uruguay
69. Nothoscordum portoalegrense Ravenna - Rio Grande do Sul in Brazil
70. Nothoscordum pulchellum Kunth - central Brazil
71. Nothoscordum punillense Ravenna - Córdoba + San Luis in Argentina
72. Nothoscordum rigidiscapum Ravenna - Uruguay
73. Nothoscordum saltense Ravenna - Salta + Catamarca in Argentina
74. Nothoscordum scabridulum Beauverd - Uruguay
75. Nothoscordum sengesianum Ravenna - Uruguay
76. Nothoscordum serenense Ravenna - Coquimbo in Chile
77. Nothoscordum setaceum (Baker) Ravenna - Uruguay
78. Nothoscordum stenandrum Ravenna - southern Brazil
79. Nothoscordum subsessile Beauverd – Uruguay
80. Nothoscordum subtile Ravenna - Uruguay
81. Nothoscordum tafiense Ravenna - Tucumán in Argentina
82. Nothoscordum tarijanum Ravenna - Bolivia, Jujuy in Argentina
83. Nothoscordum tenuifolium Ravenna - Entre Ríos in Argentina
84. Nothoscordum tibaginum Ravenna - southern Brazil
85. Nothoscordum tricostatum Ravenna - Jujuy in Argentina
86. Nothoscordum tuyutiense Ravenna - Corrientes in Argentina
87. Nothoscordum umburucuyanum Ravenna - Corrientes in Argentina
88. Nothoscordum uruguaianum Ravenna - northern Argentina, southern Brazil
89. Nothoscordum velazcoense Ravenna - La Rioja in Argentina
90. Nothoscordum vernum Phil. - central Chile
91. Nothoscordum vigilense Ravenna - Jujuy in Argentina
92. Nothoscordum vittatum (Griseb.) Ravenna - Uruguay, northern Argentina, southern Brazil
93. Nothoscordum yalaense Ravenna - Jujuy in Argentina
94. Nothoscordum yatainum Ravenna - Corrientes in Argentina

=== Formerly included ===
Several species formerly placed in Nothoscordum are now accepted in other genera, including Allium, Latace, Oziroe, and Tristagma. We provide links to help you find appropriate information.

- Nothoscordum andinum (Poepp.) Kunth ex Fuentes – Latace andina
- Nothoscordum aureum (Kellogg) Hook.f. 1871 not (Lindl.) I.M.Johnst. & Parodi 1930 - Bloomeria crocea var. aurea
- Nothoscordum fictile - Oziroe acaulis
- Nothoscordum graminifolium - Tristagma graminifolium
- Nothoscordum inodorum - Allium neapolitanum
- Nothoscordum inutile - Allium inutile
- Nothoscordum mairei - Allium wallichii
- Nothoscordum neriniflorum - Allium neriniflorum
- Nothoscordum serenense Ravenna – Latace serenense
- Nothoscordum sessile - Oziroe acaulis
- Nothoscordum siculum - Allium siculum
- Nothoscordum sulvia - Allium tuberosum
- Nothoscordum tubiflorum - Allium tubiflorum

== Bibliography ==
- Crosa, O (1975). "Zoellnerallium, un género nuevo para la tribu Allieae (Liliaceae)". Darwiniana (in Spanish). 19: 331–334.
- Crosa, O (2004). "Segunda especie y justificación del género Zoellnerallium (Alliaceae)". Darwiniana (in Spanish). 42 (1–4): 165–168.
- Sassone, Agostina B.; Arroyo-Leuenberger, Silvia C.; Giussani, Liliana M. (2014). "Nueva Circunscripción de la tribu Leucocoryneae (Amaryllidaceae, Allioideae)". Darwiniana. Nueva Serie. 2 (2): 197–206. doi:10.14522/darwiniana/2014.22.584. ISSN 0011-6793.
