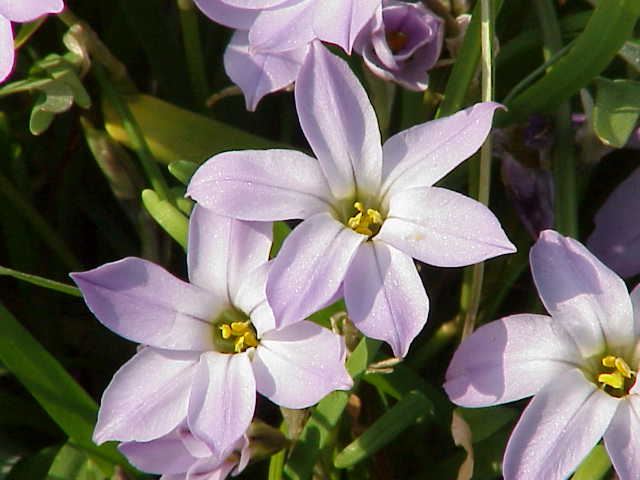
- Ipheion uniflorum

Scientific classification
- Kingdom: Plantae
- Clade: Tracheophytes
- Clade: Angiosperms
- Clade: Monocots
- Order: Asparagales
- Family: Amaryllidaceae
- Subfamily: Allioideae
- Tribe: Gilliesieae; Baker, J. Linn. Soc. London, Bot. 14: 509, 1875

Type genus
- Gilliesia Lindl.

Genera
- See text

Synonyms
- Gillesiaceae Lindley; Gilliesioideae (Lindl.) Arn.,

= Gilliesieae =

Tribe of flowering plants

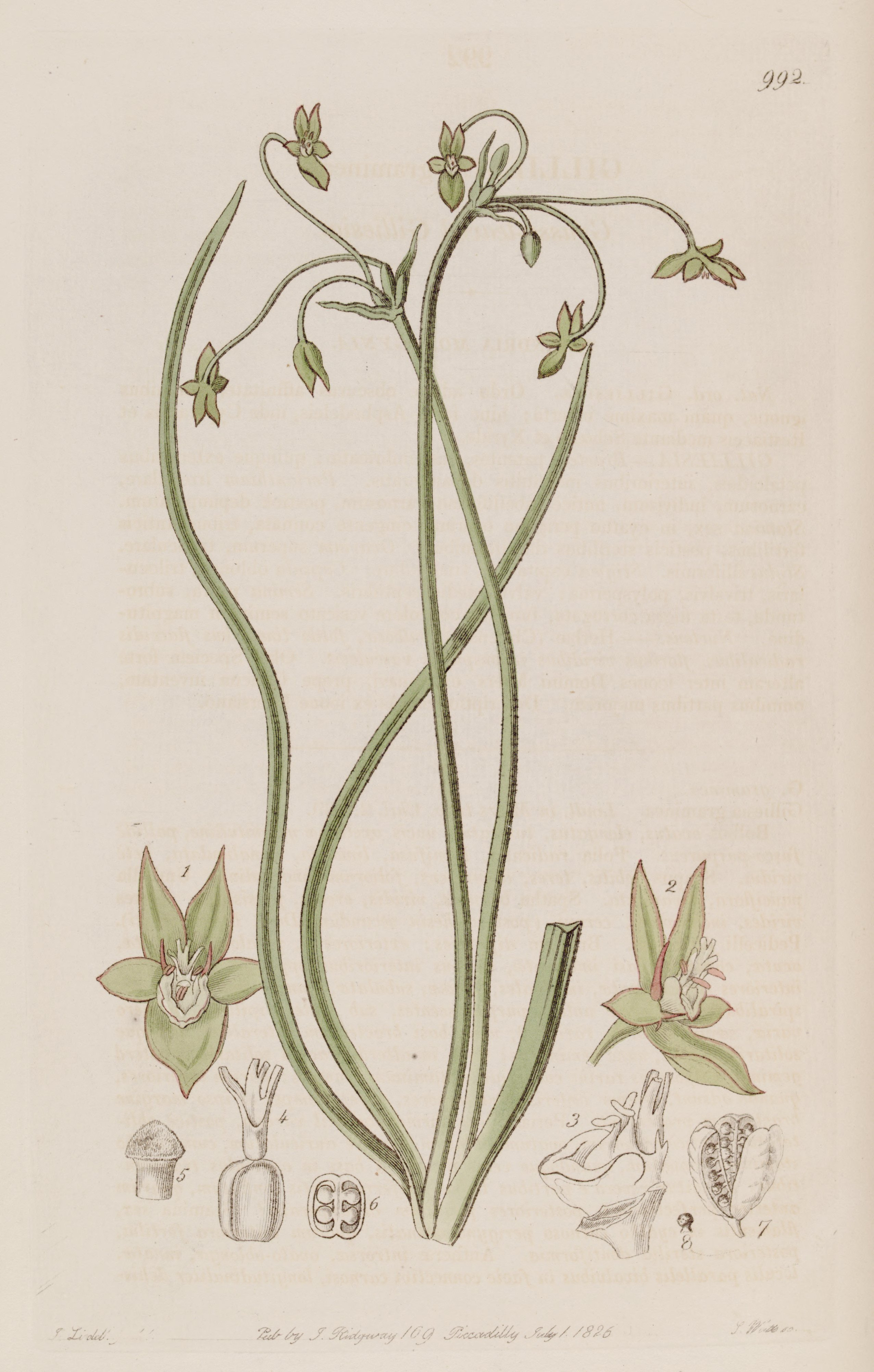
Gilliesia graminea, by John Lindley 1826

Gilliesieae is a tribe of herbaceous geophyte plants belonging to the subfamily Allioideae of the Amaryllis family (Amaryllidaceae). Described in 1826, it contains fifteen genera and about eighty species. It has been variously treated as a subfamily or tribe. It is native to the Southern United States, Central and South America, predominantly Chile. Of the three tribes of genera that make up the subfamily Allioideae, Gilliesieae is the largest and most variable. The tribe was divided into two tribes in 2014, Gilliesiae s.s. and Leucocoryneae, based on differences in floral symmetry and septal nectaries.

== Description ==
Gilliesieae are perennial herbaceous geophytes characterised by simple or prolific bulbs, sometimes with lateral rhizomes. Leaf sheaths are long, tepals are more or less fused and the corona is absent. Spathe formed from 1–2 bracts. The style is more or less gynobasic. The ovary usually has two ovules per locule, side by side. There are 2–3 stamens. The commonest chromosome number is x=4. Gilliesiae is distinguished from Leucocoryneae by zygomorphic floral symmetry and the absence of septal nectaries. By contrast Leucocoryneae are zygomorphic and have septal nectaries.

=== Leucocorynae ===
Leucocoryneae are terrestrial perennial herbaceous plants. They have tunicate bulbs, which may be simple or prolific (with bulbils), rarely lateral rhizomes. The outer bulb scales (cataphyll) are papyraceous, colourless or violaceous (Zoellnerallium). They may or may not have a garlic like odour. The leaves are large, with membranous sheaths, usually forming an underground neck. The leaf lamina is flat, green, and glaucous, glabrous or papillose. The inflorescence may be pauciflor (Ipheion, Beauverdia, rarely Tristagma) or pluriflor (up to 30). The spathe is formed by a single bifid membranous bract (Ipheion) or from two papyraceous bracts partially fused at the base. The pedicels, which are not articulated at the receptacles, are papillose or glabrous. The flowers are hermaphroditic and actinomorphic, the perianth corolla like, with 6 (8 in Beauverdia) tepals fused at their base to form a floral tube arising around the ovary. There are 6 stamens (8 in Beauverdia), 3 fertile and 3 not (staminodes), rarely 6 (Leucocoryne), in two whorls of three (Tristagma, Ipheion) or one whorl. The filaments which are adnate (fused) to the tepals, uniting at their bases, the anthers dorsifixed (attached at their back) are oblong, yellow brown or green. The ovaries are superior and sessile with three (four in Beauverdia) carpels and locules (four in Beauverdia) and septal nectaries. The number of ovules is either 2, 4 or 30 per locule, arranged in two rows. The style is apical and persistent. The stigma has three (four in Beauverdia) lobes, or is trifid, and is papillose. The capsule, which is humifuse (Ipheion, Beauverdia) or aerocarpic, globose or prismatic, and contains many seeds (pluriseeded) which are irregular and polyhedral with a black tegmen. The embryo is linear or slightly curved.

== Taxonomy ==
Representative species

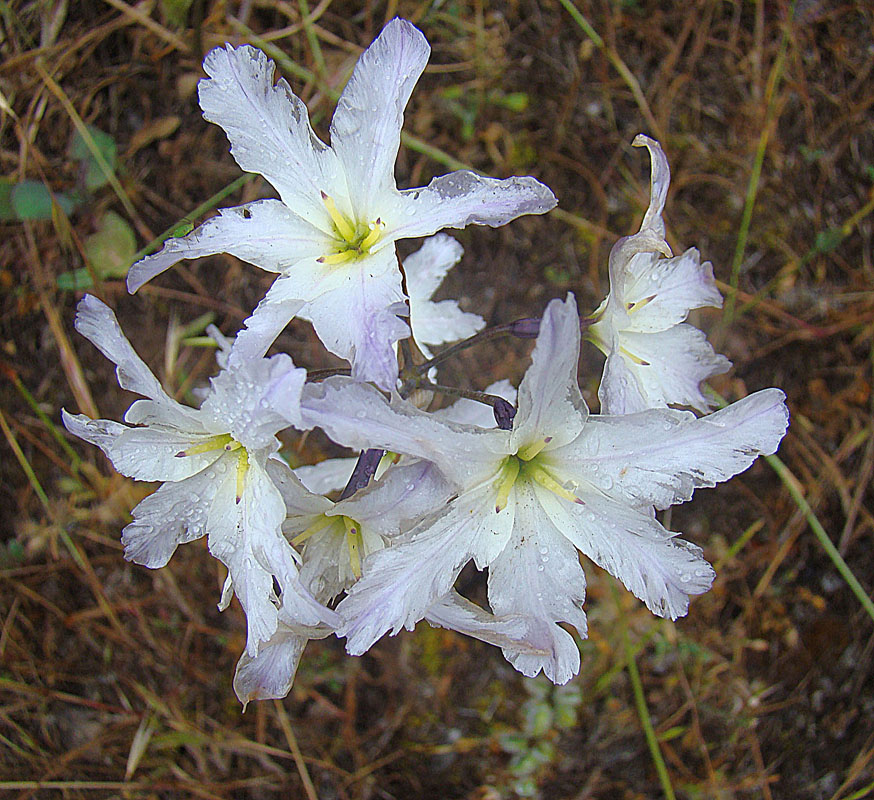
Leucocoryne ixioides

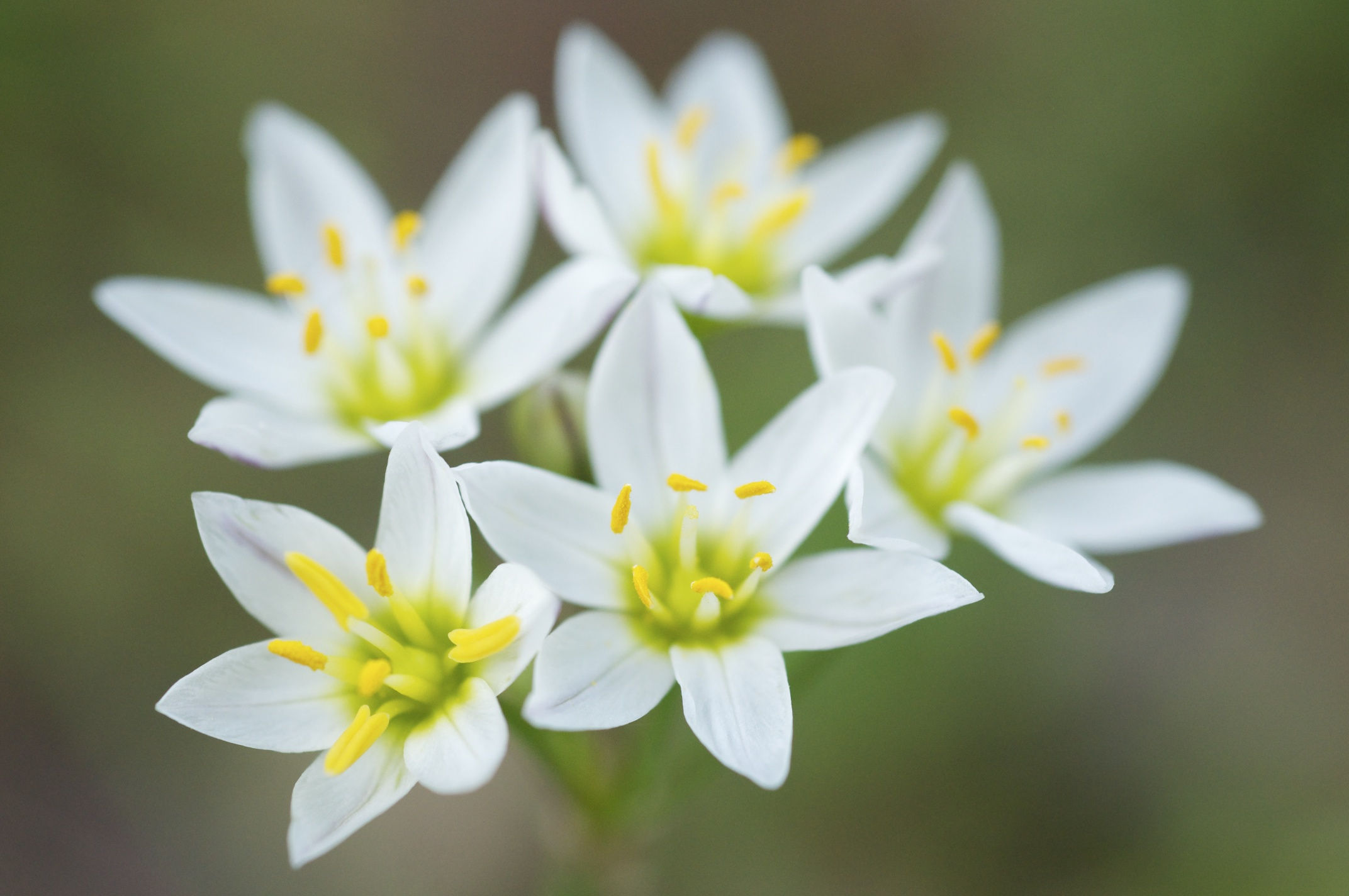
Nothoscordum bivalve

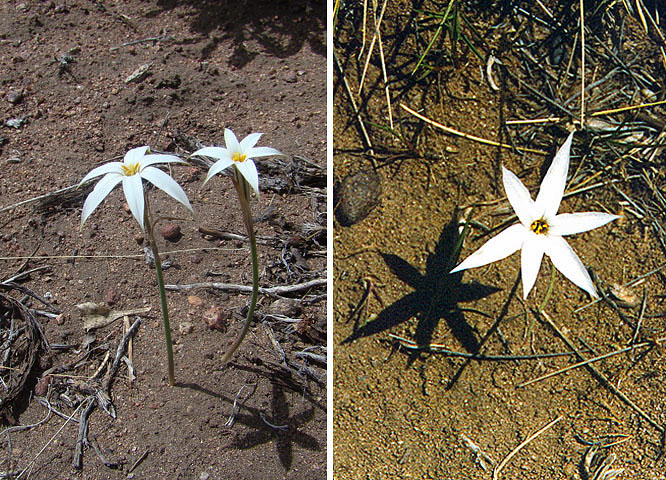
Tristagma patagonicum

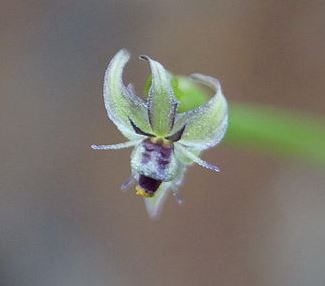
Miersia chiliensis

=== History ===
Lindley described Gilliesia in 1826, after fellow botanist John Gillies, placing this genus and another Chilean genus Miersia which he described at the same time, in a new taxon, Gilliesieae. These and related genera have been variously assigned to families Liliaceae, Amaryllidaceae, Alliaceae and even Gilliesiaceae over their history, often as tribe Gilliesieae Lindl. In 1985, Dahlgren's treatment of the Alliaceae (now Allioideae) within the monocotyledons, recognised three subfamilies; Gilliesioideae (Lindl.) Am., together with Agapanthoideae and Allioideae. These corresponded to Hutchinson's (1959) three tribes within his expanded Amaryllidaceae (Agapantheae, Allieae, and Gilesieae). The Gilliesioideae contained nine genera endemic to the southern part of South America, predominantly Chile.

=== Phylogenetic era (subfamily Gilliesioideae) 1996 ===
In 1996, a molecular phylogenetic study of the rbcL gene showed Gilliesia and related genera clustering in a separate clade at subfamilial level. The authors rejected the proposal of Traub (1982) of a separate family, Gilliesiaceae (later resurrected by Ravenna), but rather created the Gilliesioideae, as one of three subfamilies within Alliaceae, together with Allioideae and Tulbaghioideae. As phylogenetically constructed, Gilliesioideae (Gilliesioideae (Lindl.) Am., Botany: 134. 1832 - Gilliesieae Lindl. in Bot. Reg.: ad t. 992. 1826. - Type: Gilliesia Lindl.) consisted of those New World Alliaceae not included in the other two subfamilies, which included both the former Gilliesieae (Ancrumia, Erinna, Gethyum, Gilliesia, Miersia, Solaria and Trichlora) together with Ipheion, Leucocoryne, Nothoscordum, and Tristagma. Garaventia and Steinmannia were not included in the study, but considered to be part of this newly reconstructed subfamily, a total of 13 genera. This is the circumscription which the Angiosperm Phylogeny Group (APG) accepted in the APG classification of 1998 and which later became known as Alliaceae sensu stricto (s.s.). In the 2003 update (APGII) it was proposed to include Agapanthaceae and Amaryllidaceae under Alliaceae, while recognising an argument for renaming the overarching family from Alliaceae to Amaryllidaceae.

This construction of Gilliesioideae, which represented nearly all the Alliaceae genera (i.e. except Allium and Tulbaghia), implicitly recognised that it was composed of two groups or tribes, informally referred to as Ipheieae and Gilliesieae. The Ipheieae were actinomorphic, and included Ipheion, Nothoscordum, Leucocoryne s.l. (including Pabellonia and Stemmatium). Gilliesieae were rare, mostly zygomorphic, mostly endemic to Chile and typified by Gilliesa. It contained about eight genera (Ancrumia, Gethyum, Gilliesia, Miersia, Schickendantziella, Solaria and Trichlora). The genera of Gilliesioideae were thus morphologically and genetically diverse, which has made generic delimitation problematic and many species have at times been included in various different genera, and a number of genera have been shown to be polyphyletic. Consequently, the number of genera included tends to be variable.

A more detailed analysis using multiple markers (Fay et al. 2006) confirmed the monophyly of Gilliesioideae as a whole, as were the two tribes, although some genera such as Ipheion and Nothoscordum were biphyletic. In general the Gilliesieae, with their unusual floral morphology, have genera that are closely related. For instance Ancrumia, Gethyum and Solaria have been treated as three, two or one (Solaria) genus by different authors (see Genera and notes).

=== APG III familial realignment (tribe Gilliesieae) 2009 ===
In 2009, Chase et al. more formally brought together the three families, Agapanthaceae, Alliaceae, Amaryllidaceae, under the single Asparagalean monophyletic family, now renamed Amaryllidaceae from Alliaceae, reversing the Dahlgrenian process of family splitting. This necessitated reducing the existing ranks of the component subfamilial taxa. This formed the basis for the 2009 APG classification (APGIII). Thus subfamily Gilliesioideae became tribe Gilliesieae (Baker, J. Linn. Soc., Bot. 14: 509. 24 Apr 1875) within subfamily Allioideae of family Amaryllidaceae. Within the tribe they included thirteen genera including Leucocoryne s.l. (see Genera).

The full taxonomy of tribe Gilliesieae remains unresolved. Of the South America genera, a number have common features (tunicate bulbs, inflorescences with unarticulated pedicels, and one or two bracts subtending the inflorescence). These are Ipheion Raf., Leucocoryne Lindl., Nothoscordum Kunth, Tristagma Poepp., and Zoellnerallium Crosa. The position of Ipheion is particularly problematic.

=== Division of Ipheion (resurrection of Beauverdia) ===
In 1972, Ipheion was divided into two sections, Hirtellum and Ipheion. However, the development of phylogenetic analysis revealed that Ipheion was not monophyletic, although the division into sections was later supported. Beauverdia Herter had been first described in 1943. Originally, it was created to distinguish those species with unifloral inflorescences from others with plurifloral inflorescences within Nothoscordum and other genera, no longer considered Amaryllidaceae. As proposed, it had ten species but its independence was short lived, being returned to a synonym of Ipheion, and a number of species were transferred to other genera, including Nothoscordum and Tristagma.

In 2014, Ipheion section Hirtellum was again raised to genus rank and restored to the tribe, being distinguished from other Ipheion species, under the older name of Beauverdia, with four species found in Argentina, southern Brazil, and Uruguay.

=== Division of Gilliesieae and resurrection of Leucocoryneae ===
In 2014 Sassone also proposed resurrecting an older taxon, Leucocorynae to include six genera, Beauverdia (4 species), Ipheion s.s. (3 species), Leucocoryne s.l. (15 species), Nothoscordum (c. 20 species), Tristagma (c. 20 species) and Zoellnerallium (2 species). Leucocorynae had originally been described by Ravenna in 2001 as a tribe of Gilliesioideae, to include Leucocoryne together with Tulbaghia (now in separate tribe, Tulbaghieae) on morphological grounds, but it was not adopted. Instead, as described by Rudall et al. (2002) and Fay et al. (2006) there was a general recognition, as described above of two tribes, Ipheieae nom. nud. (4 genera) and Gilliesieae (7 genera) differing by actinomorphic floral symmetry and the presence of septal nectaries in the former. Subsequently, Zoellnerallium was added to the Ipheieae, even though with the reduction of Gilliesioideae to the tribe Gilliesieae, the older divisions could no longer be recognised, at least as tribes (possibly subtribes).

This now formally divides the tribe Gilliesieae s.l. into two tribes, Gilliesieae s.s. (8 genera) and Leucocoryneae (6 genera). This new tribe corresponds to the older Ipheieae, together with the two more recent additions of Beauverdia and Zoellnerallium and includes about 65 species, although this could be closer to 130, according to Ravenna's proposals for Nothoscordum which would increase its species from 20 to about 60.

The taxonomy of Gilliesieae s.s. remains difficult with limited sampling, because of the problem of obtaining material from these little-known plants. Hence the different treatment of a number of the genera by different authors. (see Genera and notes)

=== Genera ===
==== Included genera ====
Included genera according to Chase et al., as modified by Sassone et al. 2014 and García et al. 2022.

Tribe Leucocoryneae (Ipheieae group) (Ravenna) Sassone, S.C. Arroyo & Giussani

- Atacamallium Nic.García (2022)
- Beauverdia Herter (1943).
- Ipheion Raf. (1836).
- Leucocoryne Lindl. (1830).
- Nothoscordum Kunth (1843).
- Tristagma Poepp. (1833).
- Zoellnerallium Crosa (1975).

Tribe Gilliesieae s.s.

- Ancrumia Harv. ex Baker (1877). (Note: Ancrumia: Rahn (1998) considered Ancrunia to be part of Solaria (Kubitzki 1998, Rahn: Alliaceae. pp. 70–78) but both (Zöllner & Arriagada 1998) and (Rudall et al. 2002) considered them as separate genera. As of 2014, the World Checklist considers the single species of this genus to be a synonym of Solaria cuspidata, and does not accept Ancrumia as a separate genus (see discussion above). (WCSP 2015, WCSP Ancrumia))
- Erinna Phil. (1864). (Note: Erinna: Described by Philippi in 1864 as a monotypic genus, based on Erinna gilliesioides. (Philippi 1864, 1073. Erinna. p. 266) As such it was a genus within Alliaceae, and included in the phylogenetic construction of Gilliesieae in 1996.(Fay & Chase 1996) Although (Ravenna 2000) proposed transferring it to Leucocoryne on morphological grounds, (Sassone et al. 2014b) it was included separately by (Chase et al. 2009) and hence the 2009 APGIII. (APG 2009) (Sassone et al. 2014b) Although the World Checklist lists Erinna as a synonym of Leucocoryne, (WCSP 2015, Erinna Phil.) (Sassone et al. 2014b) still considered its status uncertain.)
- Gethyum Phil. (1873). (Note: Gethyum: Rahn (1998) considered Gethyum to be part of Solaria, (Kubitzki 1998, Rahn: Alliaceae. pp. 70–78) but both (Zöllner & Arriagada 1998) and (Rudall et al. 2002) considered them as separate genera and Gethyum was included in the 2009 construction of Gilliesiea, (Chase et al. 2009) as discussed above. However the World Checklist considers it part of Solaria. (WCSP 2015, Gethyium)(Fay & Hall 2007))
- Gilliesia Lindl. (1826). Type species
  - (including Pabellonia Quezada & Martic. and Stemmatium Phil.)
- Miersia Lindl. (1826).
- Schickendantziella Speg. (1903).
- Solaria Phil. (1858).
- Speea Loes. (1927).
- Trichlora Baker (1877).

==== Uncertain, doubtful or former genera ====
Three genera have been transferred to Allium. Caloscordum Herb. (1844)., which is now more properly considered part of Allium, Both Herbert (1844) and Lindley (1847) had originally considered it a distinct genus, while others considered it as part of Nothoscordum.(Li 1996) Milula is embedded in Allium as a section. Garaventia is considered part of Tristagma. Muilla was included in the Allioideae by Dahlgren, but in tribe Brodiaeeae. That tribe was subsequently raised to family status as Themidaceae.

- Caloscordum Herb. (1844). (Subgenus of Allium)
- Garaventia Looser (1941). (syn. Tristagma)
- Milula Prain (1896). (Section of Allium)
- Muilla S.Watson ex Bentham (1883). (Themidaceae)
- Nectaroscordum Lindl. (1836). (Subgenus of Allium)

=== Species ===
There are about eighty species included in the tribe.

== Distribution ==
The Gilliesieae are endemic to the southern part of South America, predominantly Chile. The Leucocoryneae are also a South American tribe with the exception of two species of Nothoscordum (N bivalve, N. gracile) which extend to southern North America, otherwise they are found in southern Brazil, Argentina, Uruguay and Chile. (see map in Stevens 2013).

== Bibliography ==
=== General ===
- Lindley, John (1846). An Introduction to the Natural System of Botany: or, A Systematic View of the Organisation, Natural Affinities, and Geographical Distribution, of the Whole Vegetable Kingdom. London: Bradbury.
- Philippi, RA (1864). "Plantarum novarum Chilensium, inclusis quibusdam Mendocinis et Patagonicis". Linnaea. 33: 1–308.
- Hutchinson, John (1959). The families of flowering plants, arranged according to a new system based on their probable phylogeny. 2 vols. Macmillan.
- Dahlgren, R.M.; Clifford, H.T.; Yeo, P.F. (1985). The families of the monocotyledons. Berlin: Springer-Verlag. ISBN 978-3-642-64903-5. Available on Google Books
- Kubitzki, K., ed. (1998). The families and genera of vascular plants. Vol.3. Berlin, Germany: Springer-Verlag. ISBN 978-3-540-64060-8.
- Stevens, P.F. (2013), "Asparagales: Amaryllidaceae", Angiosperm Phylogeny Website
- The Angiosperm Phylogeny Group (1998). "An ordinal classification for the families of flowering plants" (PDF). Annals of the Missouri Botanical Garden. 85 (4): 531–553. doi:10.2307/2992015. JSTOR 2992015. S2CID 82134384. Archived from the original (PDF) on 2011-06-08.
- The Angiosperm Phylogeny Group (April 2003). "An update of the Angiosperm Phylogeny Group classification for the orders and families of flowering plants: APG II". Botanical Journal of the Linnean Society. 141 (4): 399–436. doi:10.1046/j.1095-8339.2003.t01-1-00158.x.
- Angiosperm Phylogeny Group (2009), "An update of the Angiosperm Phylogeny Group classification for the orders and families of flowering plants: APG III", Botanical Journal of the Linnean Society, 161 (2): 105–121, doi:10.1111/j.1095-8339.2009.00996.x, hdl:10654/18083
- Chase, Mark W.; Reveal, James L.; Fay, Michael F. (October 2009). "A subfamilial classification for the expanded asparagalean families Amaryllidaceae, Asparagaceae and Xanthorrhoeaceae". Botanical Journal of the Linnean Society. 161 (2): 132–136. doi:10.1111/j.1095-8339.2009.00999.x.
- Rina Kamenetsky; Hiroshi Okubo, eds. (2012). Ornamental Geophytes: From Basic Science to Sustainable Production. CRC Press. ISBN 978-1-4398-4924-8.
- Howard, Thad M. (2001). Bulbs: From Warm Climates. Austin: University of Texas. ISBN 978-0292731264.

=== Amaryllidaceae (Gilliesieae) ===
- Lindley, John (1826). "Gilliesia graminea". Edwards' Botanical Register. 12: t. 992.
- Hutchinson, J (1939). "The tribe Gilliesieae of Amaryllidaceae". Herbertia. 6: 136–145.
- Huber, Herbert F.J. (1969). "Die Samenmerkmale und Verwandtschaftsverhältnisse der Liliiflorae". Mitt. Bot. Staatssamml. [Mitteilungen der Botanischen Staatssammlung München]. 8: 219–538.
- Traub, H. P. (1982). "Order Alliales". Plant Life. 38: 119–132.
- Fay, Michael F.; Chase, Mark W. (August 1996). "Resurrection of Themidaceae for the Brodiaea alliance, and Recircumscription of Alliaceae, Amaryllidaceae and Agapanthoideae". Taxon. 45 (3): 441–451. doi:10.2307/1224136. JSTOR 1224136.
- Fay, MF; Rudall, PJ; Chase, MW (2006). "Molecular Studies of Subfamily Gilliesioideae (Alliaceae)". Aliso. 22: 367–371. doi:10.5642/aliso.20062201.30.
- Escobar, Inelia; Ruiz, Eduardo; Baeza, Carlos (2012). "Estudios cariotípicos en especies de Gilliesieae Lindl. (Gilliesioideae-Alliaceae) de Chile central". Gayana. Botánica. 69 (2): 240–250. doi:10.4067/S0717-66432012000200003.
- Dutilh, J.H.A. (2009). "Neotropical Alliaceae". Milliken, W., Klitgård, B. & Baracat, A. Neotropikey - Interactive key and information resources for flowering plants of the Neotropics.
- Li, Q.-Q.; Zhou, S.-D.; He, X.-J.; Yu, Y.; Zhang, Y.-C.; Wei, X.-Q. (21 October 2010). "Phylogeny and biogeography of Allium (Amaryllidaceae: Allieae) based on nuclear ribosomal internal transcribed spacer and chloroplast rps16 sequences, focusing on the inclusion of species endemic to China". Annals of Botany. 106 (5): 709–733. doi:10.1093/aob/mcq177. PMC 2958792. PMID 20966186.
- Rudall, P. J.; Bateman, R. M.; Fay, M. F.; Eastman, A. (1 December 2002). "Floral anatomy and systematics of Alliaceae with particular reference to Gilliesia, a presumed insect mimic with strongly zygomorphic flowers". American Journal of Botany. 89 (12): 1867–1883. doi:10.3732/ajb.89.12.1867. PMID 21665616.
- Friesen, N (November 2000). "Molecular and Morphological Evidence for an Origin of the Aberrant Genus Milula within Himalayan Species of Allium (Alliacae)". Molecular Phylogenetics and Evolution. 17 (2): 209–218. doi:10.1006/mpev.2000.0844. PMID 11083935. S2CID 27171819.
- Friesen, Nikolai; Fritsch, Reinhard M.; Blattner, Frank R. (2006). "Phylogeny and new intrageneric classification of Allium (Alliaceae) based on nuclear ribosomal DNA ITS sequences". Aliso. 22: 372–395. doi:10.5642/aliso.20062201.31.
- Sassone, Agostina B.; Arroyo-Leuenberger, Silvia C.; Giussani, Liliana M. (31 December 2014b). "Nueva Circunscripción de la tribu Leucocoryneae (Amaryllidaceae, Allioideae)". Darwiniana. Nueva Serie. 2 (2): 197–206. doi:10.14522/darwiniana/2014.22.584. hdl:11336/37649. ISSN 0011-6793.
- Torres-Mellado, Gustavo A; Escobar, Inelia; Palfner, Gotz; Casanova-Katny, M. Angélica (June 2012). "Mycotrophy in Gilliesieae, a threatened and poorly known tribe of Alliaceae from central Chile". Revista Chilena de Historia Natural. 85 (2): 179–186. doi:10.4067/S0716-078X2012000200004.
- Zöllner, O.; Arriagada, L. (1998). "The tribe Gilliesieae (Alliaceae) in Chile". Herbertia. 53: 104–107.
- Ravenna, P . (2000a). "The family Gilliesiaceae". Onira Botanical Leaflets. 4: 11–14.

=== Genera ===
- Herter, WG (1943). "Beauverdia genus novum Liliacearum". Boissiera. 7: 505–512.
- Herbert, W (1844). "64. Caloscordum". Edwards' Botanical Register. 30: 66–70.
- Lindley, J (1847). "Caloscordum nerinefolium. Nerine-leaved Caloscord". Edwards' Botanical Register. 33: Plate 5.
- Li, R. J.; Shang, Z. Y.; Cui, T. C.; J. M. Xu., J. M. (1996). "Studies on Karyotypes and Phylogenetic Relationship of Allium Sect. Caloscordum (Liliaceae) from China". Acta Phytotax. Sin. (in Chinese). 34 (3): Acta Phytotax. Sin. Archived from the original on 2015-01-21.
- Fay, Michael F.; Hall, Tony (May 2007). "589. Gethyum atropurpureum". Curtis's Botanical Magazine. 24 (2): 121–126. doi:10.1111/j.1467-8748.2007.00573.x.
- Rix, Martyn; Strange, Kit; Rudall, Paula J. (April 2013). "753. Gilliesia montana". Curtis's Botanical Magazine. 30 (1): 28–35. doi:10.1111/curt.12014.
- Sassone, Agostina B.; Giussani, Liliana M.; Guaglianone, Encarnación R. (30 April 2013). "Multivariate studies of Ipheion (Amaryllidaceae, Allioideae) and related genera". Plant Systematics and Evolution. 299 (8): 1561–1575. doi:10.1007/s00606-013-0819-5. hdl:11336/18970. S2CID 254058196.
- Sassone, Agostina B.; Giussani, Liliana M.; Guaglianone, Encarnación R. (1 July 2014a). "Beauverdia, a Resurrected Genus of Amaryllidaceae (Allioideae, Gilliesieae)". Systematic Botany. 39 (3): 767–775. doi:10.1600/036364414X681527. hdl:11336/19039. S2CID 86287897.
- Ravenna, P. F. (2000). "New or noteworthy Leucocoryne species (Alliaceae)". Onira. 4: 3–10.
- Ravenna, P. F. (2001). "New or noteworthy Leucocoryne species (Alliaceae) III". Onira. 5: 42–43.
- Jara-Arancio, Paola; Arroyo, Mary T. K.; Guerrero, Pablo C.; Hinojosa, Luis F.; Arancio, Gina; Méndez, Marco A.; Carine, Mark (February 2014). "Phylogenetic perspectives on biome shifts in Leucocoryne (Alliaceae) in relation to climatic niche evolution in western South America" (PDF). Journal of Biogeography. 41 (2): 328–338. doi:10.1111/jbi.12186. S2CID 54017262. Archived from the original (PDF) on 4 March 2016.
- Crosa, O (1975). "Zoellnerallium, un género nuevo para la tribu Allieae (Liliaceae)". Darwiniana (in Spanish). 19: 331–334.
- Crosa, O (2004). "Segunda especie y justificación del género Zoellnerallium (Alliaceae)". Darwiniana (in Spanish). 42 (1–4): 165–168.

=== Databases ===
- "Home". The Plant List (2013). Version 1.1. 2013.
- "Quick Search". World Checklist of Selected Plant Families. Royal Botanic Gardens, Kew.
