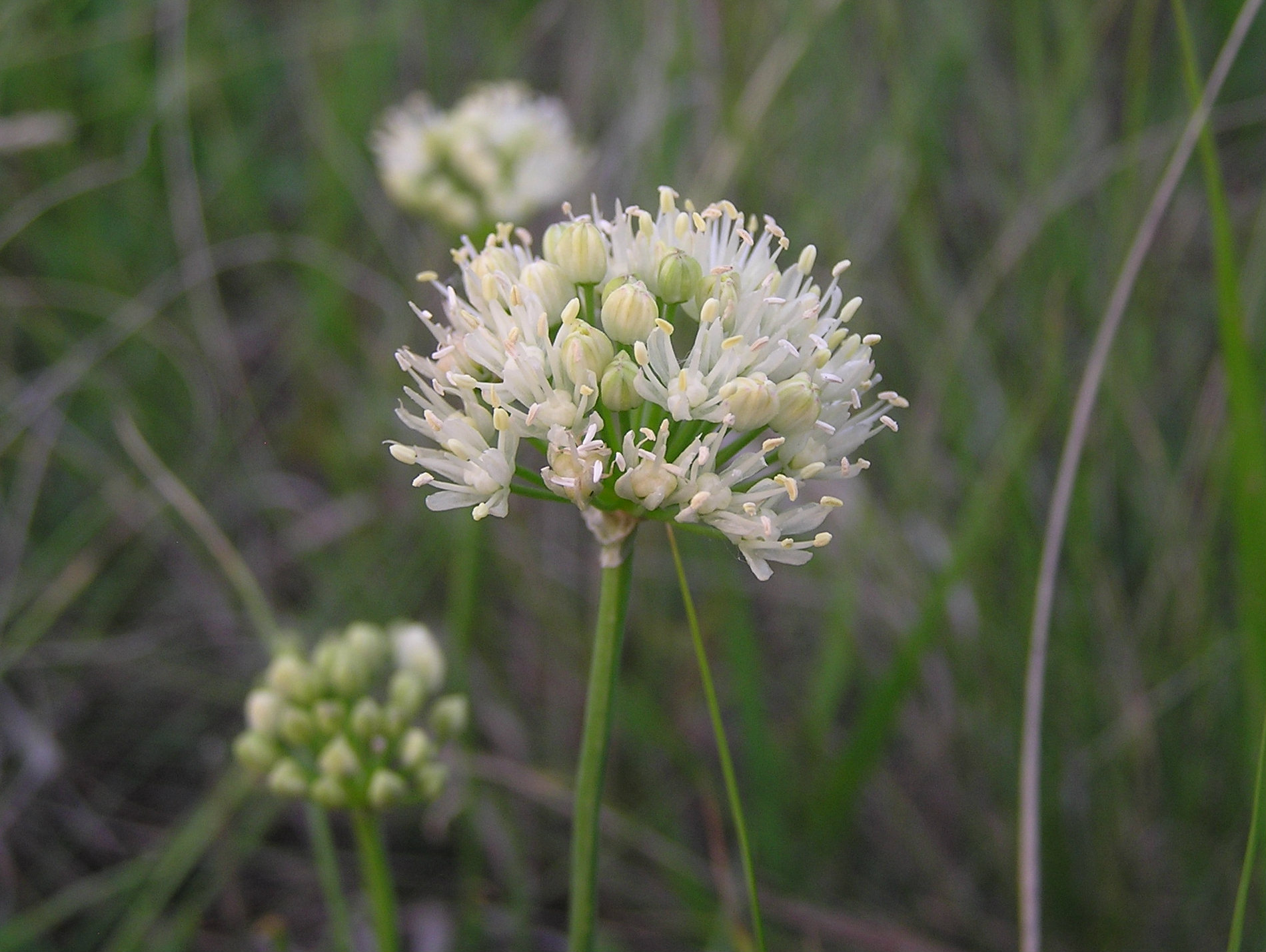

Scientific classification
- Kingdom: Plantae
- Clade: Tracheophytes
- Clade: Angiosperms
- Clade: Monocots
- Order: Asparagales
- Family: Amaryllidaceae
- Subfamily: Allioideae
- Genus: Allium
- Species: A. flavescens

Binomial name
- Allium flavescens Besser 1821 not Poepp. ex Kunth (syn of Nothoscordum bivalve)

Synonyms
- Allium angulosum var. flavescens (Besser) Regel

= Allium flavescens =

Species of flowering plant

Allium flavescens is a Eurasian species of wild onion native to Bulgaria, Romania, Ukraine, European Russia, Western Siberia, Altay Krai, and Kazakhstan.
