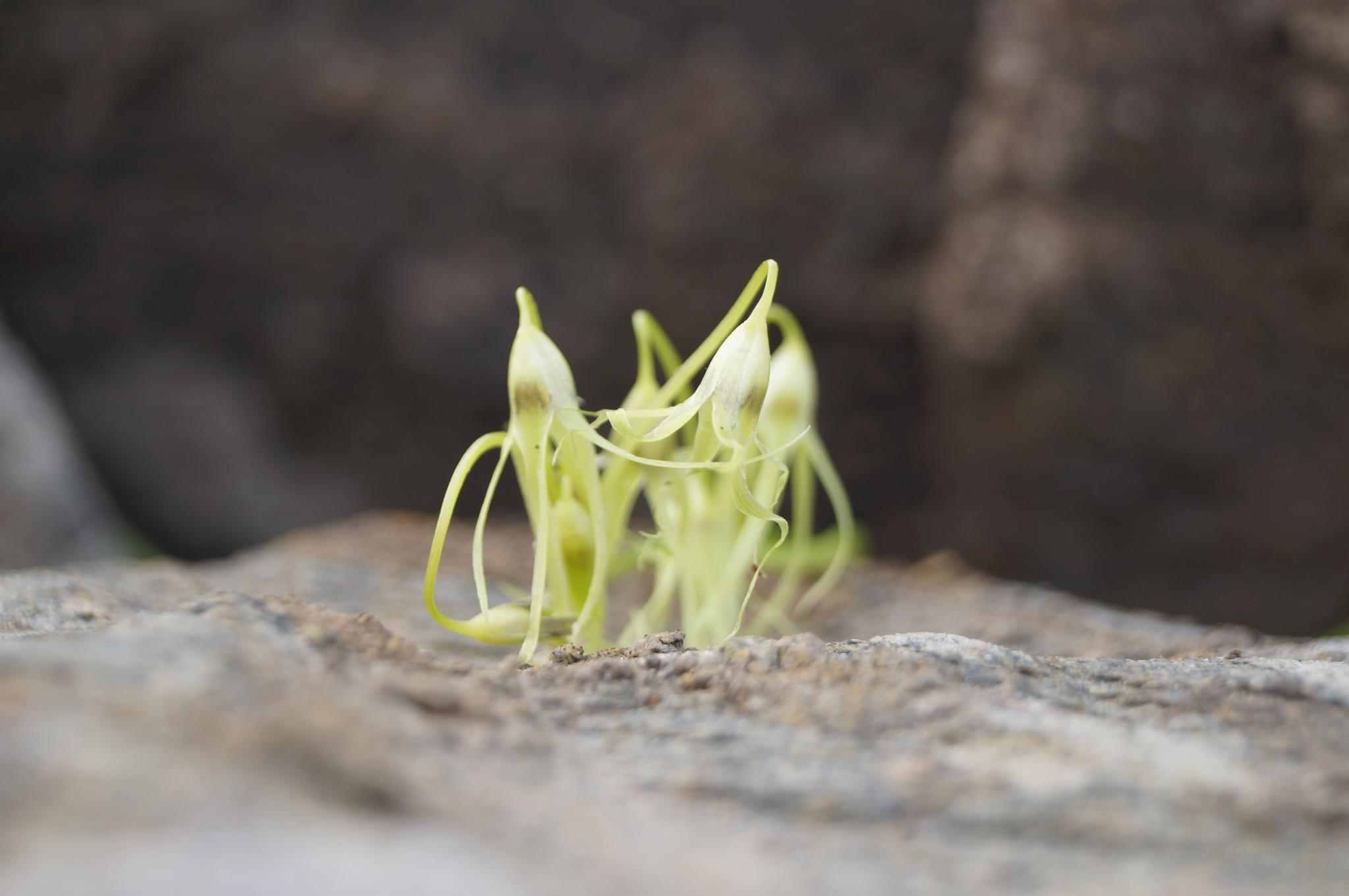
- Solaria cuspidata

Scientific classification
- Kingdom: Plantae
- Clade: Tracheophytes
- Clade: Angiosperms
- Clade: Monocots
- Order: Asparagales
- Family: Amaryllidaceae
- Subfamily: Allioideae
- Tribe: Gilliesieae
- Genus: Solaria; Phil.

Type species
- Solaria miersioides Phil.

Synonyms
- Symea Baker; Gethyum Phil.; Ancrumia Harv. ex Baker

= Solaria (plant) =

Genus of plants

Solaria is a genus of South American plants in the family Amaryllidaceae, subfamily Allioideae, tribe Gilliesieae, native to Chile and Argentina. Kew treats Solaria as a synonym of Gilliesia.

The genus is named in honor of Chilean mathematician Francisco Borja de Solar.

Species

- Solaria atropurpurea (Phil.) Ravenna - Chile (O'Higgins, Santiago)
- Solaria attenuata Ravenna - Chile, Argentina (Neuquén)
- Solaria brevicoalita Ravenna - Chile (Maule)
- Solaria curacavina Ravenna - Chile (Santiago)
- Solaria cuspidata (Harv. ex Baker) Ravenna - Chile (Coquimbo)
- Solaria miersioides Phil. - Chile
