= Erinna (disambiguation) =

Erinna may refer to:

- Erinna, the Greek poet
- Erinna (gastropod), a genus of a freshwater snail
- Erinna (plant), a plant genus
