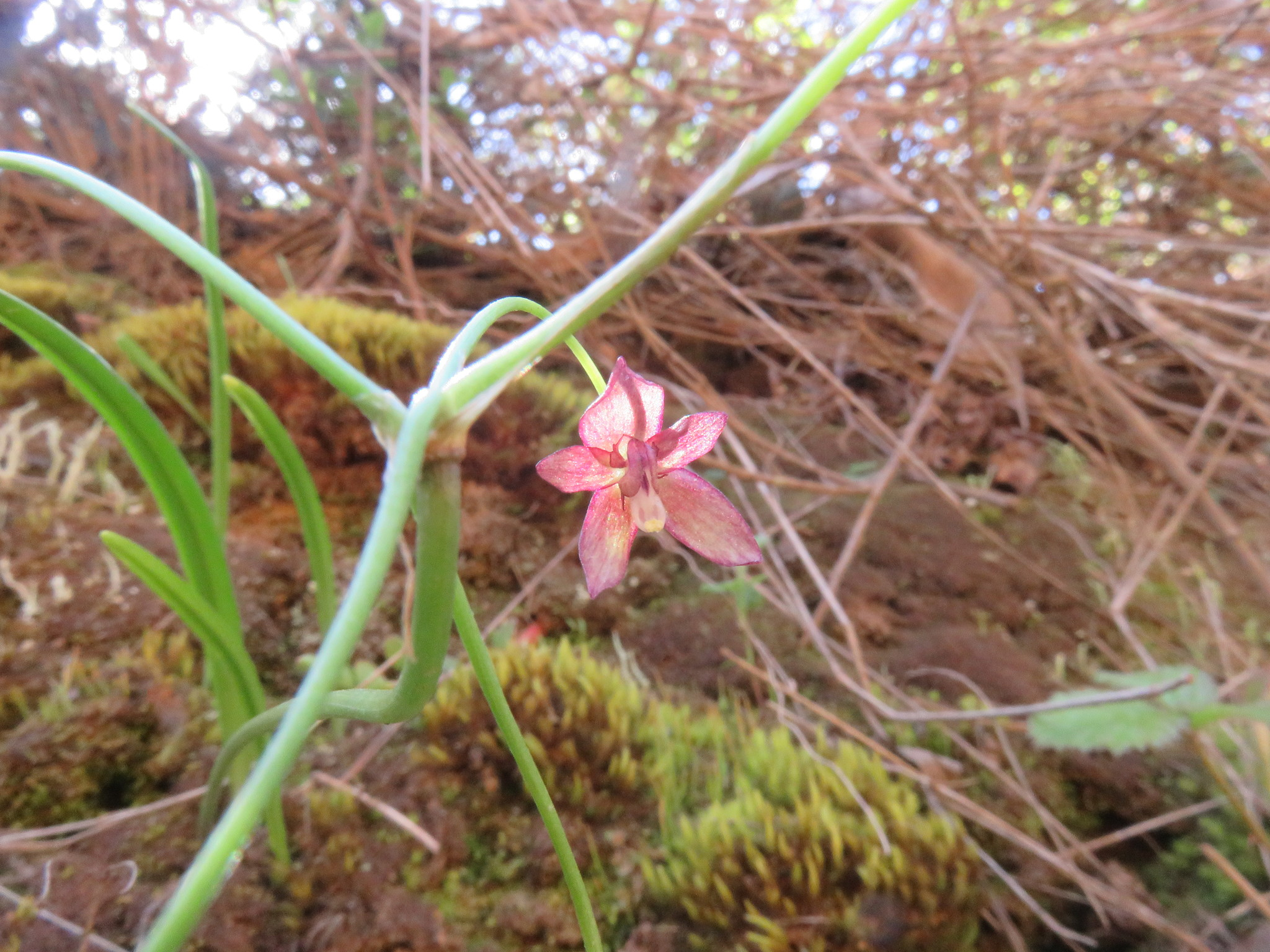

Scientific classification
- Kingdom: Plantae
- Clade: Tracheophytes
- Clade: Angiosperms
- Clade: Monocots
- Order: Asparagales
- Family: Amaryllidaceae
- Subfamily: Allioideae
- Genus: Gilliesia
- Species: G. montana

Binomial name
- Gilliesia montana Poepp. & Endl., 1838

= Gilliesia montana =

Species of plant

Gilliesia montana is a species of flowering plant in the family Amaryllidaceae. This species is a perennial herb endemic to Chile where it is distributed between the Maule and Araucanía regions.
