= Atacamallium =

Scientific classification
- Kingdom: Plantae
- Clade: Tracheophytes
- Clade: Angiosperms
- Clade: Monocots
- Order: Asparagales
- Family: Amaryllidaceae
- Subfamily: Allioideae
- Tribe: Leucocoryneae
- Genus: Atacamallium; Nic.García (2022)
- Species: A. minutiflorum

Binomial name
- Atacamallium minutiflorum R.Pinto & Nic.García (2022)

Genus of flowering plants

Atacamallium minutiflorum is a species of flowering plant in the family Amaryllidaceae. It is the sole species in genus Atacamallium. It is a bulbous geophyte endemic to Antofagasta Region of northern Chile, where it grows in the coastal Atacama Desert.

DNA and morphological analyses place it as a sister to genus Leucocoryne in the tribe Leucocoryneae. It is distinguished from other Leucocoryneae by having smaller flowers, tepals fused only at the base, six stamens arranged in a single series, and trifid (three-lobed) stigma.
