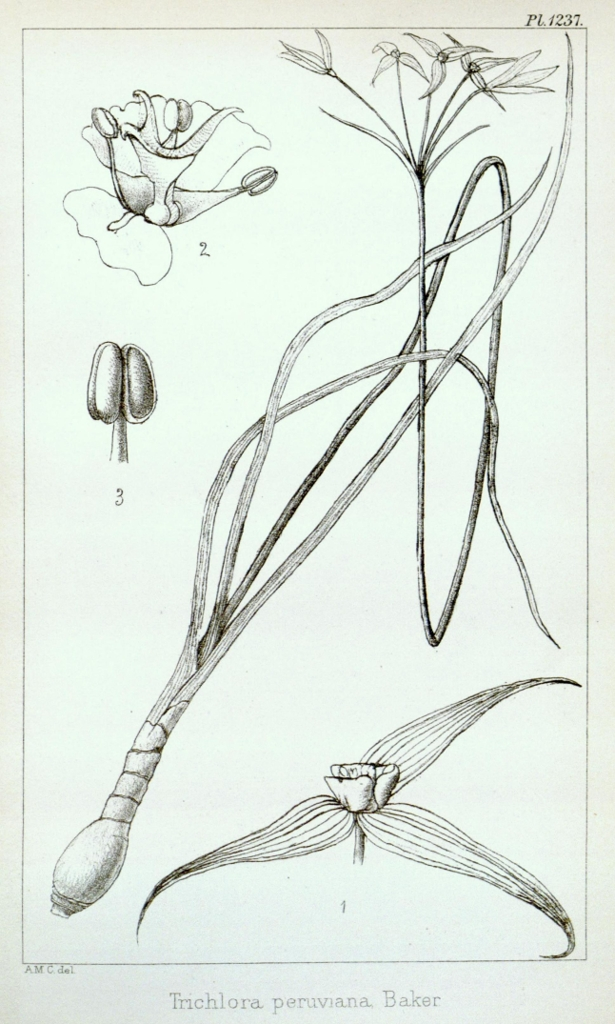
- Trichlora peruviana

Scientific classification
- Kingdom: Plantae
- Clade: Tracheophytes
- Clade: Angiosperms
- Clade: Monocots
- Order: Asparagales
- Family: Amaryllidaceae
- Subfamily: Allioideae
- Tribe: Gilliesieae
- Genus: Trichlora; Baker

Type species
- Trichlora peruviana Baker

= Trichlora =

Species of plant

Trichlora is a genus of plants in the onion subfamily within the Amaryllis family. There are 4 known species, all endemic to Peru.

- Trichlora huascarana Ravenna – Peru (Ancash)
- Trichlora lactea Ravenna – Peru (Cajamarca )
- Trichlora peruviana Baker – Peru (Lima, Cusco)
- Trichlora sandwithii Vargas – Peru (Apurímac)
