= Speea =

Scientific classification
- Kingdom: Plantae
- Clade: Tracheophytes
- Clade: Angiosperms
- Clade: Monocots
- Order: Asparagales
- Family: Amaryllidaceae
- Subfamily: Allioideae
- Tribe: Gilliesieae
- Genus: Speea; Loes.

Type species
- Speea humilis (Phil.) Loes. ex K.Krause

Synonyms
- Geanthus Phil. 1884, illegitimate homonym not Raf. 1814 (Iridaceae) nor Reinw. 1825 (Zingiberaceae)

Species of plant

Speea is a genus of Chilean plants in the onion subfamily within the Amaryllis family. Kew treats Speea as synonym of Miersia.

Species

Both known species are native to central Chile.

- Speea humilis (Phil.) Loes. ex K.Krause
- Speea triloba Ravenna
