= Schickendantziella =

Scientific classification
- Kingdom: Plantae
- Clade: Tracheophytes
- Clade: Angiosperms
- Clade: Monocots
- Order: Asparagales
- Family: Amaryllidaceae
- Subfamily: Allioideae
- Tribe: Gilliesieae
- Genus: Schickendantziella; Speg.
- Species: S. trichosepala

Binomial name
- Schickendantziella trichosepala (Speg.) Speg.

Synonyms
- Schickendantzia trichosepala Speg.

Genus of flowering plants

Schickendantziella is a plant genus in the Amaryllidaceae. It has only one species, Schickendantziella trichosepala, native to Argentina and Bolivia.
