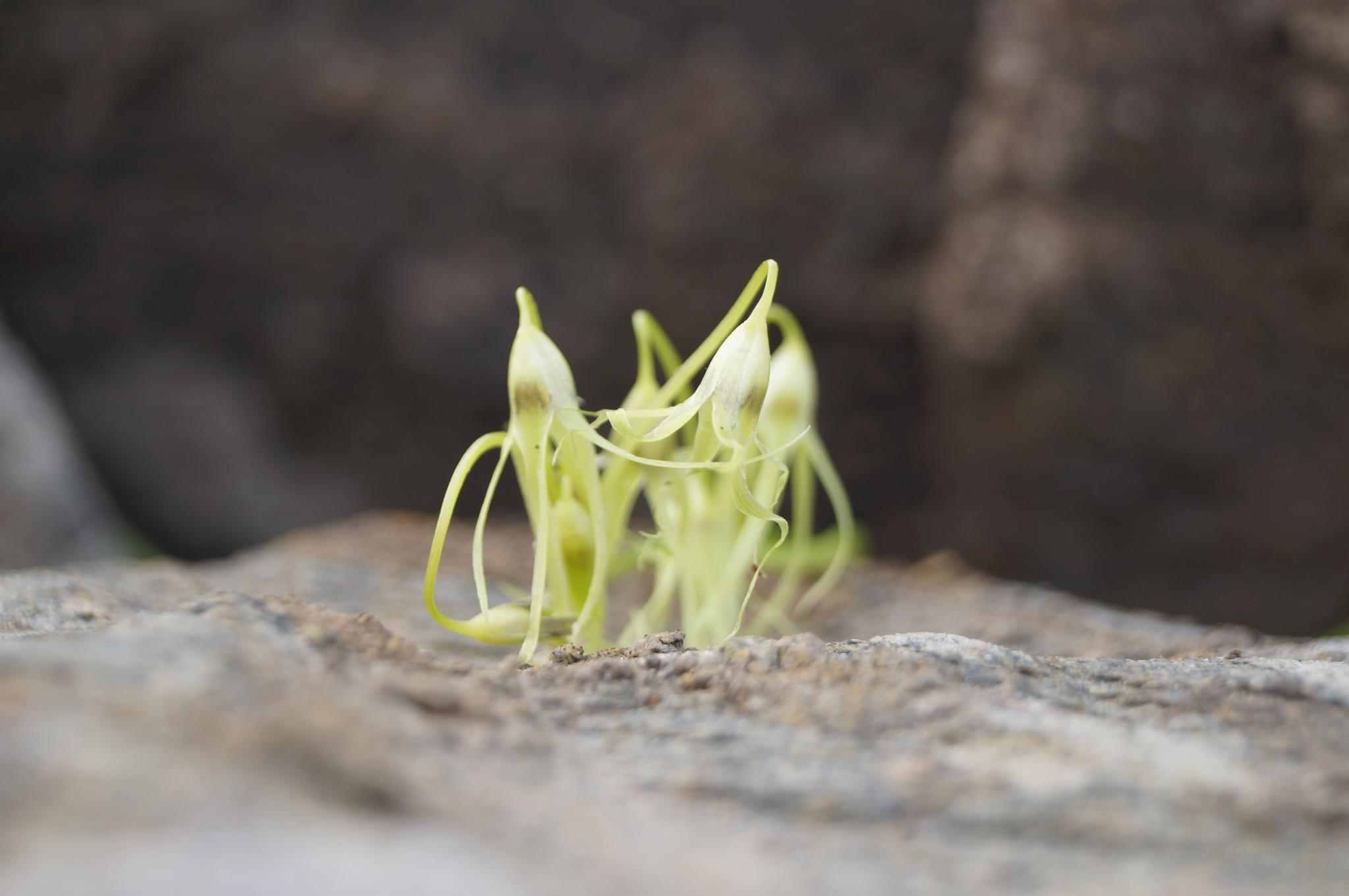

Scientific classification
- Kingdom: Plantae
- Clade: Tracheophytes
- Clade: Angiosperms
- Clade: Monocots
- Order: Asparagales
- Family: Amaryllidaceae
- Subfamily: Allioideae
- Genus: Solaria
- Species: S. cuspidata

Binomial name
- Solaria cuspidata (Harv. ex Baker) Ravenna

Synonyms
- Ancrumia cuspidata Harv. ex Baker; Gethyum cuspidatum (Harv. ex Baker) Muñoz-Schick

= Solaria cuspidata =

Species of plant

Solaria cuspidata is a species of flowering plant in the amaryllis family, Amaryllidaceae. It is endemic to the Coquimbo region of Chile.
