= Allium tubiflorum =

合被韭 he bei jiu

Scientific classification
- Kingdom: Plantae
- Clade: Tracheophytes
- Clade: Angiosperms
- Clade: Monocots
- Order: Asparagales
- Family: Amaryllidaceae
- Subfamily: Allioideae
- Genus: Allium
- Subgenus: A. subg. Caloscordum
- Species: A. tubiflorum

Binomial name
- Allium tubiflorum Rendle

Synonyms
- Caloscordum tubiforum (Rendle) Traub; Nothoscordum tubiflorum (Rendle) Stearn

Species of plant

Allium tubiflorum is a plant species native to China (Gansu, Hebei, Henan, Hubei, Shaanxi, Shanxi, Sichuan) at elevations less than 2000 m.

Allium tubiflorum is one of the few species of Allium lacking the characteristic onion/garlic scent. It produces bulbs that are solitary, round to egg-shaped, up to 20 cm across. Scapes are up to 40 cm tall. Leaves are tubular, up to 3 mm across, about the same length as the scapes. Umbels have a few red or purple flowers.
