= Allium inutile =

Scientific classification
- Kingdom: Plantae
- Clade: Tracheophytes
- Clade: Angiosperms
- Clade: Monocots
- Order: Asparagales
- Family: Amaryllidaceae
- Subfamily: Allioideae
- Genus: Allium
- Species: A. inutile

Binomial name
- Allium inutile Makino

Synonyms
- Caloscordum inutile (Makino) Okuyama & Kitag.; Nothoscordum inutile (Makino) Kitam.

Species of flowering plant

Allium inutile is a species of wild onion native to Honshu Island in Japan and to Anhui Province of southeastern China.

The scientific name translates as "useless onion" in reference to the fact that this is one of the few members of the 900-member genus Allium lacking the characteristic onion or garlic scent.

Allium inutile produces a single round to egg-shaped bulb up to 13 mm across. Scape is up to 30 cm tall, round in cross-section but with ribs along the edges. Leaves are tubular, up to 30 cm long. Umbel is rather small, with only 4-7 white flowers.
