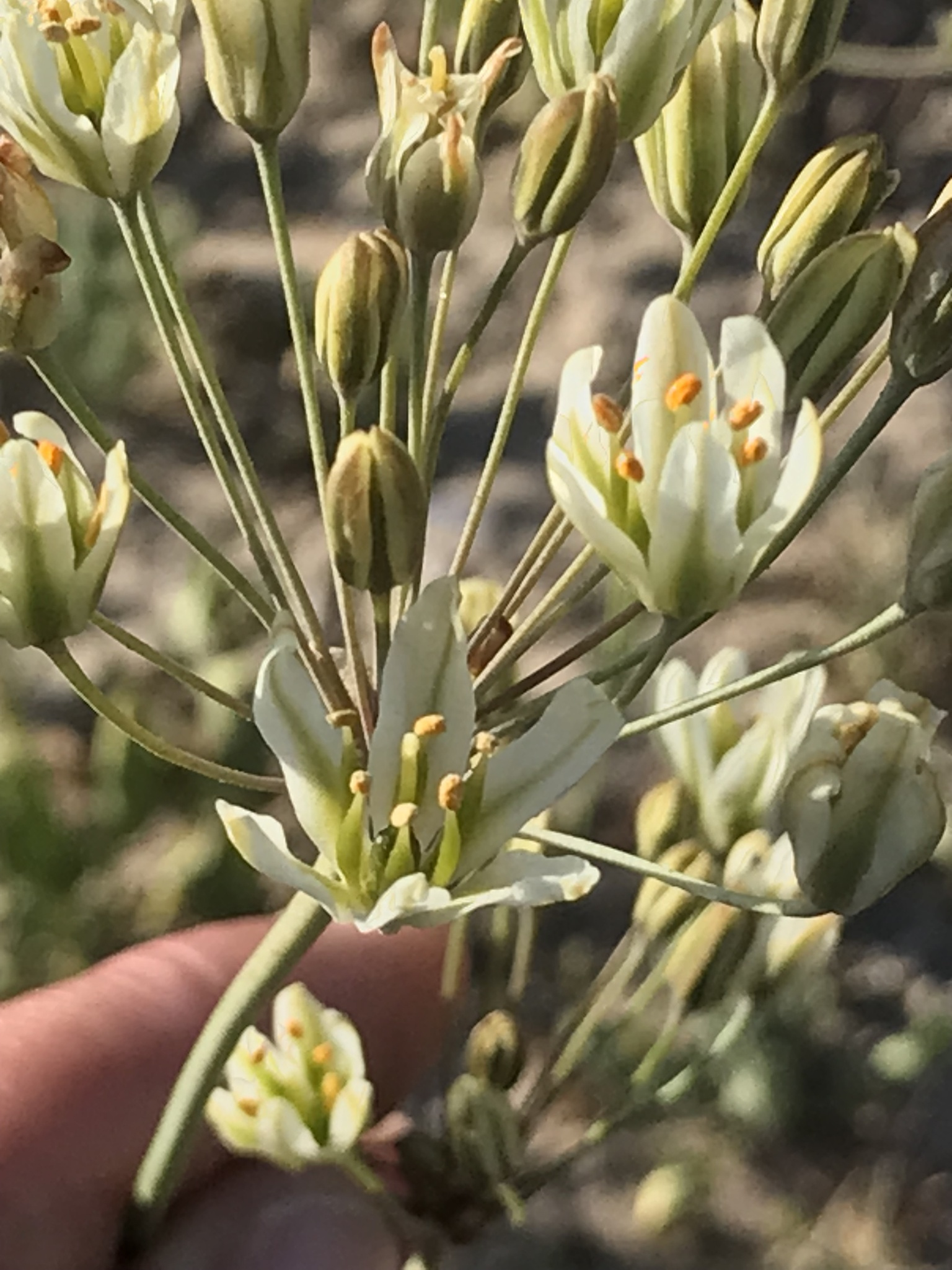
- Latace serenense
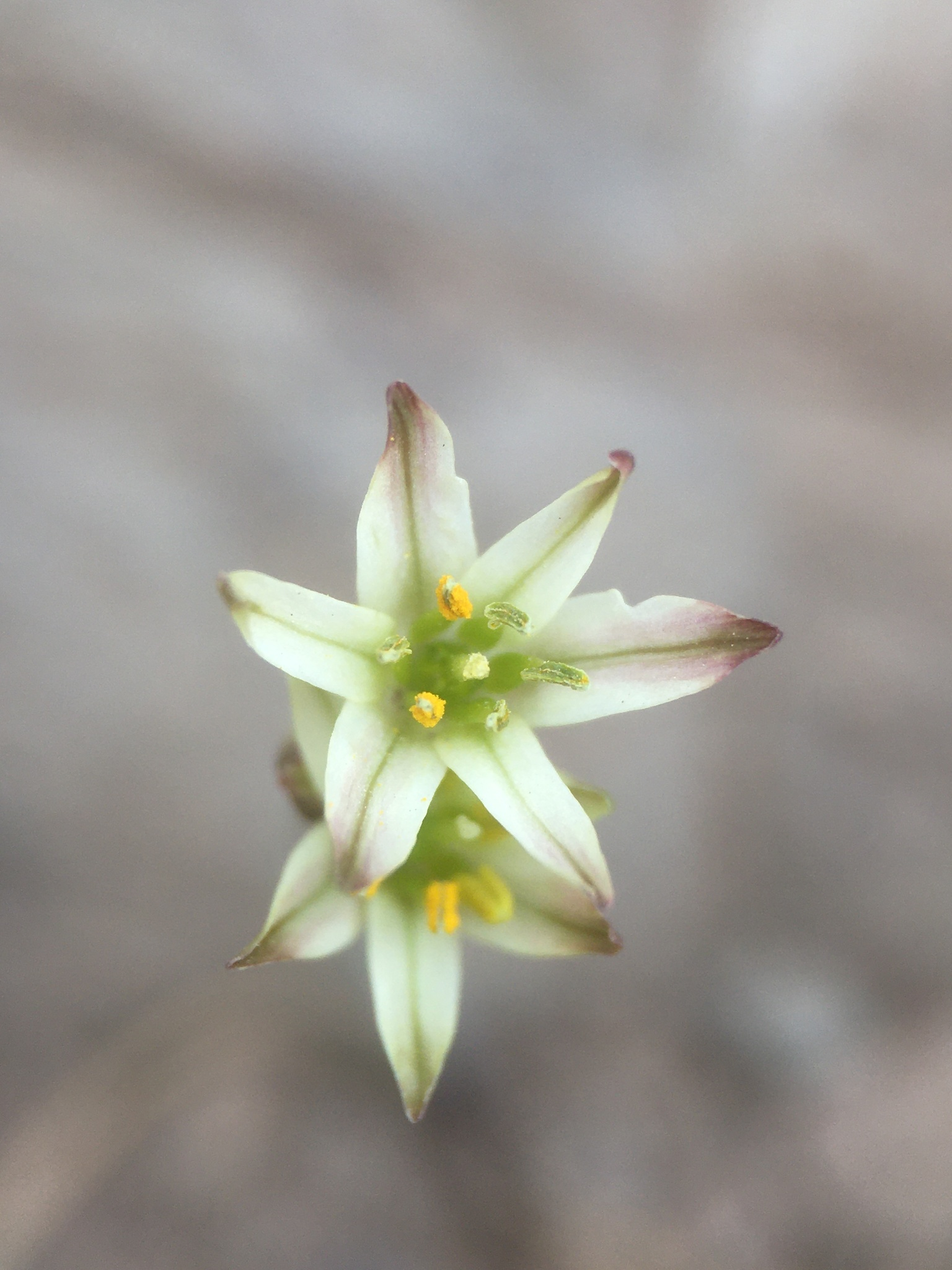
- Latace andina

Scientific classification
- Kingdom: Plantae
- Clade: Tracheophytes
- Clade: Angiosperms
- Clade: Monocots
- Order: Asparagales
- Family: Amaryllidaceae
- Subfamily: Allioideae
- Tribe: Gilliesieae
- Genus: Latace; Phil. (1889)

Type species
- Latace andina (Poepp.) Sassone

Species
- Latace andina (Poepp.) Sassone; Latace serenense (Ravenna) Sassone

Synonyms
- Zoellnerallium Crosa (1975)

= Latace =

Genus of flowering plants

Latace is a genus of flowering plants in the family Amaryllidaceae. It includes two species of bulbous geophytes native to northern and central Chile and northwestern Argentina.

- Latace andina (Poepp.) Sassone
- Latace serenense (Ravenna) Sassone

== Taxonomy ==
The genus was first described by Rodolfo Amando Philippi in 1889. Zoellnerallium is a synonym.

The genus is included in the tribe Gilliesieae, within the subfamily Allioideae. It is considered to be part of a group of four genera within Gilliesieae, referred to as Ipheieae nom. nud.. In 2014 it was proposed to create a new tribe Leucocorynae with six genera, including Latace, by splitting Gilliesieae into two separate tribes.
