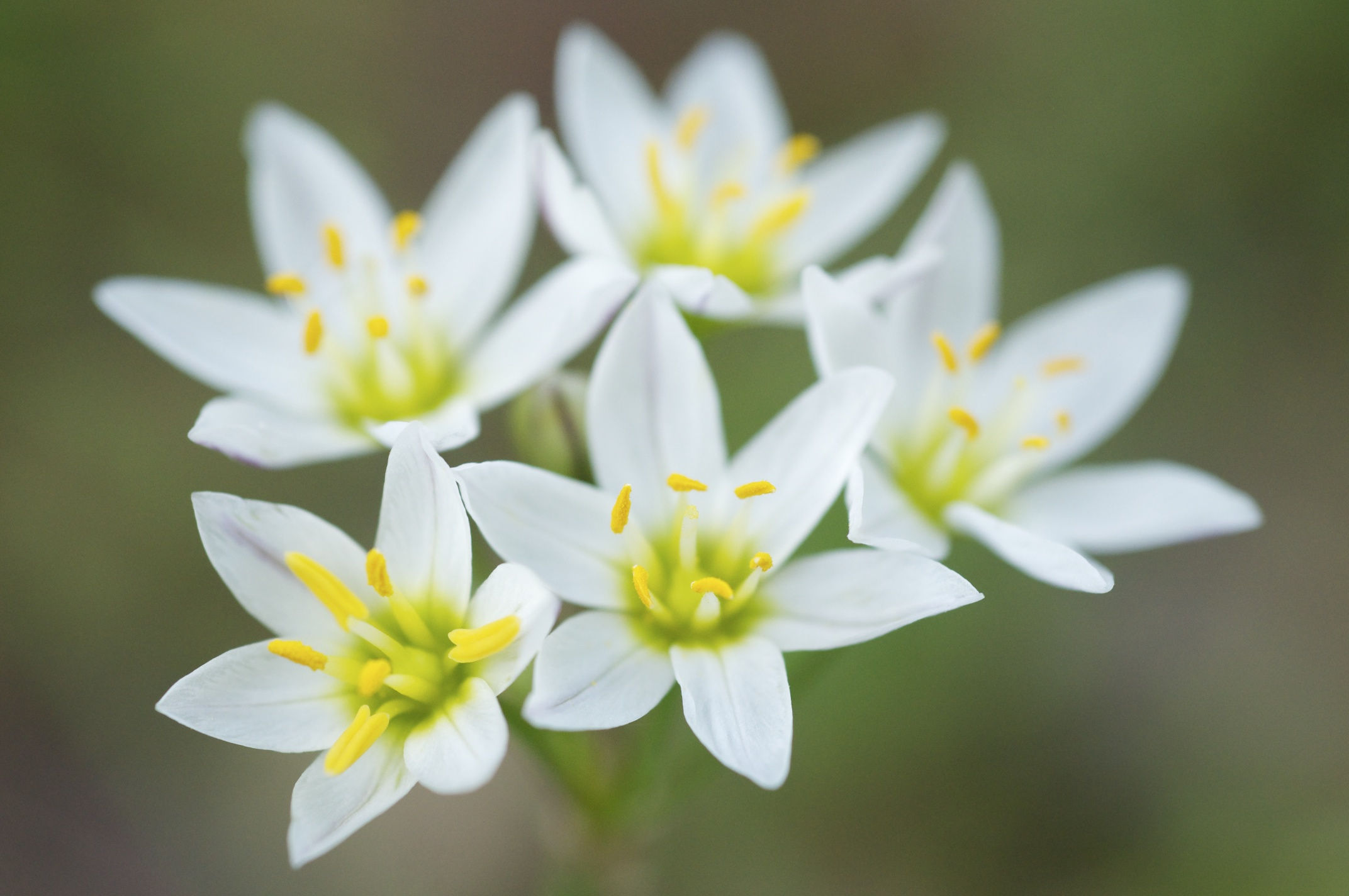

Conservation status
- Apparently Secure (NatureServe)

Scientific classification
- Kingdom: Plantae
- Clade: Tracheophytes
- Clade: Angiosperms
- Clade: Monocots
- Order: Asparagales
- Family: Amaryllidaceae
- Subfamily: Allioideae
- Genus: Nothoscordum
- Species: N. bivalve

Binomial name
- Nothoscordum bivalve (L.) Britton
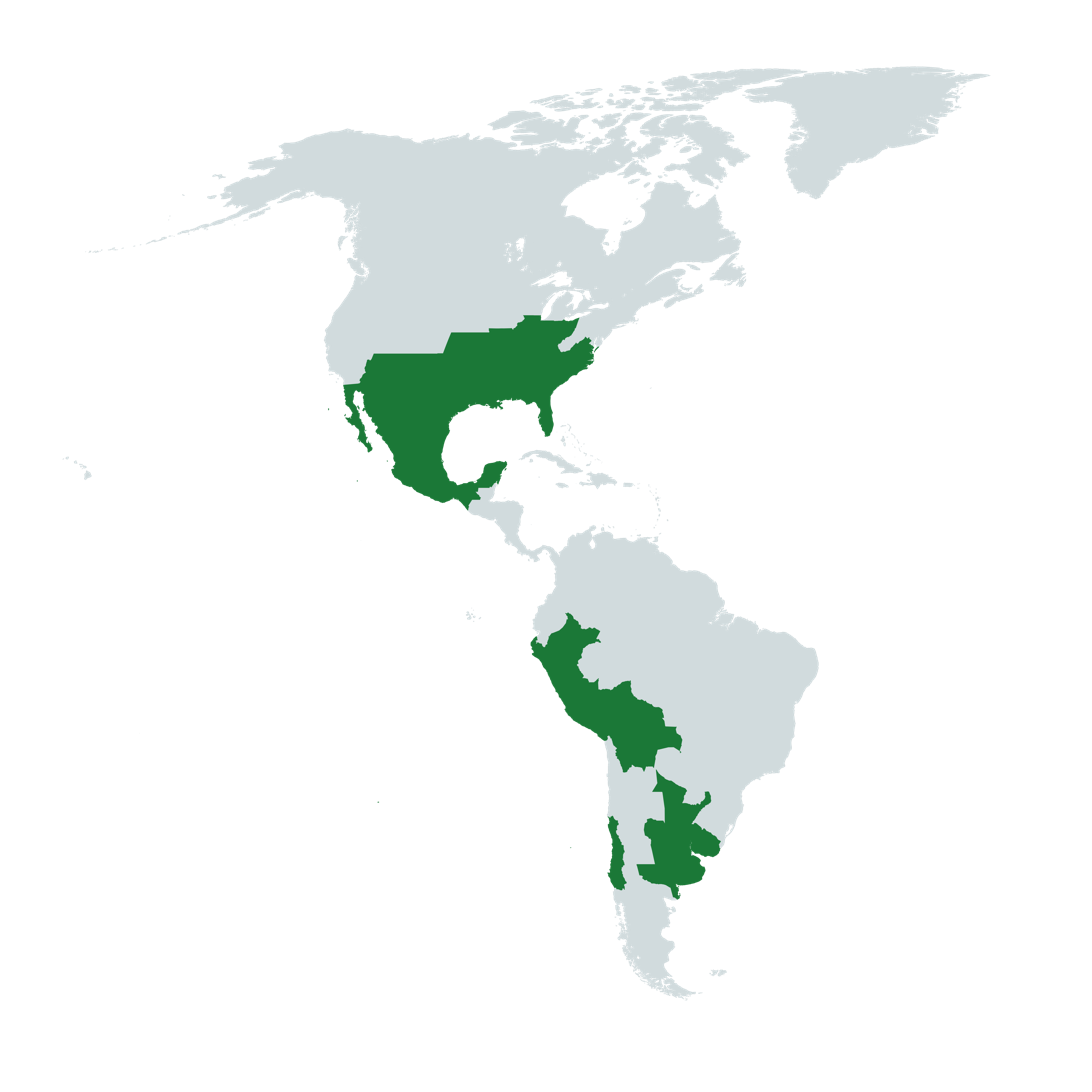

Synonyms
- Species synonymy: Allium bivalve (L.) Kuntze; Allium bivalve var. bangii Kuntze; Allium bivalve var. flavescens (Kunth) Kuntze; Allium bivalve var. sellowianum (Kunth) Kuntze; Allium bivalve var. striatum (Jacq.) Kuntze; Allium canadense Michx.; Allium flavescens Poepp. ex Kunth 1843, illegitimate homonym not Besser 1821; Allium geminatum Raf.; Allium ornithogaloides Walter; Allium sellowianum (Kunth) Regel; Allium striatellum Lindl.; Allium striatum Jacq.; Allium subbiflorum Colla; Brodiaea aurea Benth. & Hook. f.; Brodiaea berteroi (Kunth) Fuentes; Brodiaea subbiflora (Colla) Baker; Geboscon bivalve (L.) House; Geboscon geminatum (Raf.) Raf.; Geboscon striatum (Jacq.) Raf.; Hookera subbiflora Kuntze; Milla subbiflora (Colla) Baker; Nothoscordum flavescens Kunth; Nothoscordum gramineum Beauverd; Nothoscordum gramineum (Sims) P. Beauv.; Nothoscordum gramineum var. flavescens Fuentes; Nothoscordum gramineum var. philippianum Beauverd; Nothoscordum gramineum var. vernum Fuentes; Nothoscordum ornithogaloides (Walter) Kunth; Nothoscordum philippianum Kunth & C.D.Bouché; Nothoscordum sellowianum Kunth; Nothoscordum striatellum (Lindl.) Kunth; Nothoscordum striatum (Jacq.) Kunth; Nothoscordum subbiflorum (Colla) Walp.; Nothoscordum texanum M.E.Jones; Oligosma bivalve (L.) Salisb.; Ornithogalum bivalve L.; Ornithogalum carolinianum Schult. & Schult.f.; Ornithogalum gramineum Sims; Ornithogalum pulchellum Salisb.; Tristagma subbiflorum (Colla) Ravenna; Triteleia berteroi Kunth

= Nothoscordum bivalve =

Species of plant

Nothoscordum bivalve is a species of flowering plant in the family Amaryllidaceae known by the common names crow poison and false garlic. It is native to the eastern United States from Texas to Florida up to Nebraska and Ohio, as well as Mexico, Peru, Uruguay, northeastern Argentina and central Chile.

This is a common plant which grows in parks and on roadsides, and soils which are not too dry or too wet; it grows well in lawns. It's one of the first plants to flower in the spring in Texas, and it blooms from April to May in the Great Plains.

== Description ==
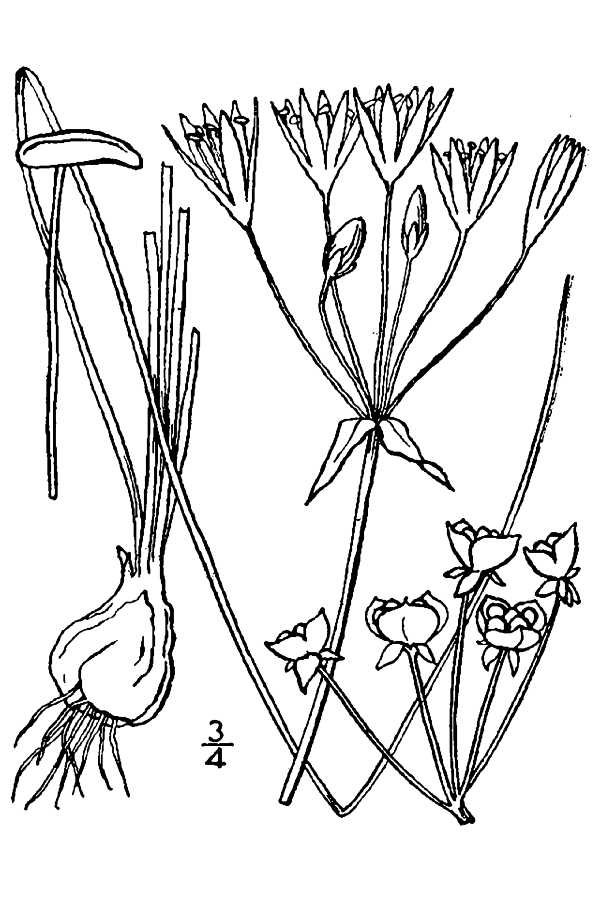
Illustration of N. bivalve used by Britton in Illustrated Flora of the Northern United States, Canada, and the British Possessions (1896).

Nothoscordum bivalve is a perennial herb growing from a bulb about a centimeter wide. It produces one erect stem, or occasionally two. They grow up to 40 centimetres (16 in) tall.

In Illustrated Flora of the Northern United States, Canada, and the British Possessions (1896), Nathaniel Lord Britton uses the following description for the species:

"Bulb globose, less than 1' in diameter, its coats membranous. Leaves 1/2" - 2 1/2" wide, flat, blunt or acutish, shorter than the scape or equalling it; bracts of the umbel lanceolate, acuminate, membranous, persistent; umbel 6-12-flowered; pedicels filiform, usually unequal, becoming rather rigid and 1' - 2' long in fruit; flowers 5" - 6" long; perianth-segments thin, oblong-lanceolate, acute, longer than the stamens; capsule obovoid or somewhat depressed, obtusely 3-lobed, 2" - 3" high, the style as long or slightly longer."

There are one to four narrow leaves up to 30 centimetres (12 in) long. The inflorescence is an umbel of 3 to 6 flowers, or sometimes up to 10. There are two bracts at the base of the umbel. The flower has six whitish tepals, each of which usually has a dark reddish midvein.

The flower does not smell of onion or garlic. It can have a faint fragrant scent. The fruit is a capsule.

== Taxonomy ==
Nothoscordum bivalve was originally described by Carl Linnaeus in his 1753 work Species Plantarum. He used the name Ornithogalum bivalve, placing it as one of the 12 original species in the star-of-Bethlehem genus.

Carl Sigismund Kunth described the genus Nothoscordum in 1843. Here, he suggests Linnaeus' O. bivalve could be a synonym for several Nothoscordum species. It wasn't until 1896 that the name Nothoscordum bivalve was used, starting with Nathaniel Lord Britton's Illustrated Flora of the Northern United States, Canada, and the British Possessions.

=== Other classifications ===
In 1796, Richard Anthony Salisbury referred to it as Ornithogalum pulchellum in his account of the plants at Chapel Allerton. This name is considered superfluous and was never widely used. In Otto Kuntze's controversial 1890s revision of taxonomy, he classified the plant as part of the Allium genus, calling it Allium bivalve. It's also been suggested as part of the Brodiaea, Milla, Tristagma, and Triteleia genuses.

== Etymology ==
The genus name, Nothoscordum, means "false garlic" in Greek. Bivalve means "two sides" and refers to the species' two bracts. The common name crow poison allegedly stems from a Cherokee legend that the flowers were lethal to crows.

== Ecology and uses ==
The bulbs can be gathered any time of year and eaten cooked. They possess a faint garlic flavor. According to the USDA, "It is grazed by livestock, but seldom represents a significant percentage of diet due to low productivity."

Because it's one of the earlier-blooming flowers in several southern US states, insects that are active early in the spring rely on it for nectar and pollen, such as the falcate orangetip.

Nothoscordum bivalve is one of the species being investigated as a potential antimicrobial treatment against antibiotic-resistant bacteria. It's been reported that the species was used to treat wounds and skin irritation by some Native American tribes in order to prevent infection, and that it could have antimicrobial and astringent properties. However, there are not yet any definitive findings that Nothoscordum bivalve is antimicrobial.

== Gallery ==
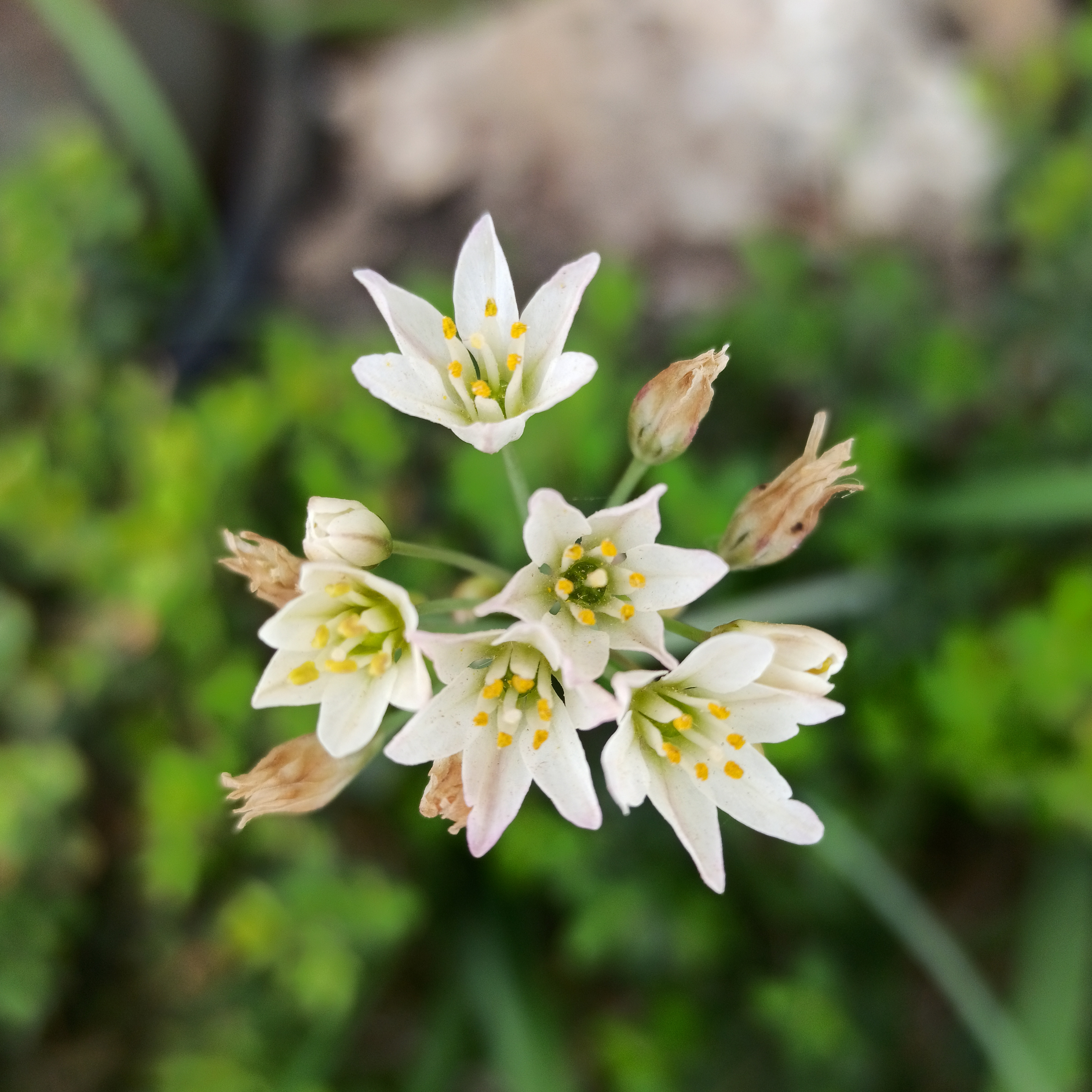
Flowers of Nothoscordum bivalve (Family: Amaryllidaceae). Crowpoison or false garlic.

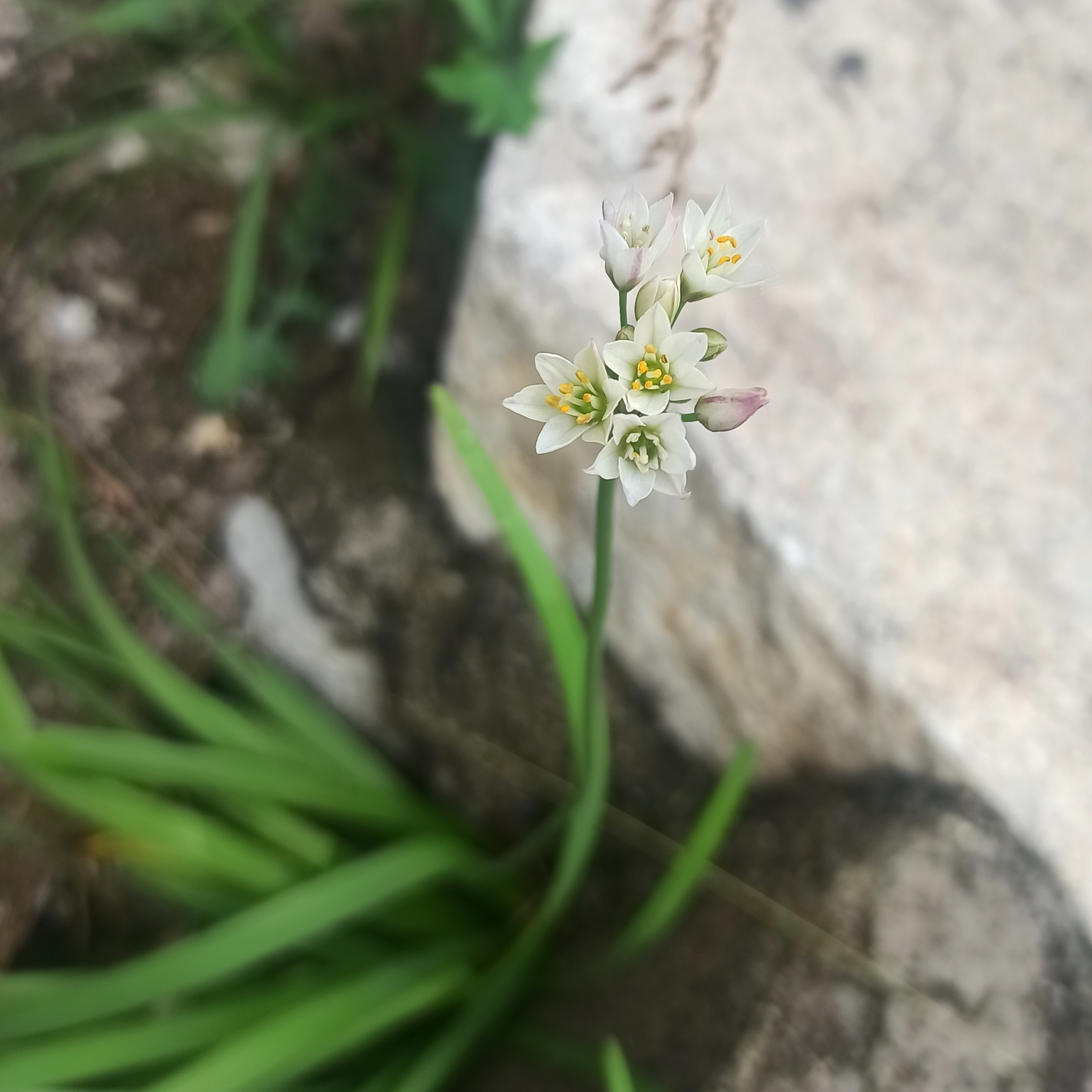
Nothoscordum bivalve (Familia: Amaryllidaceae).

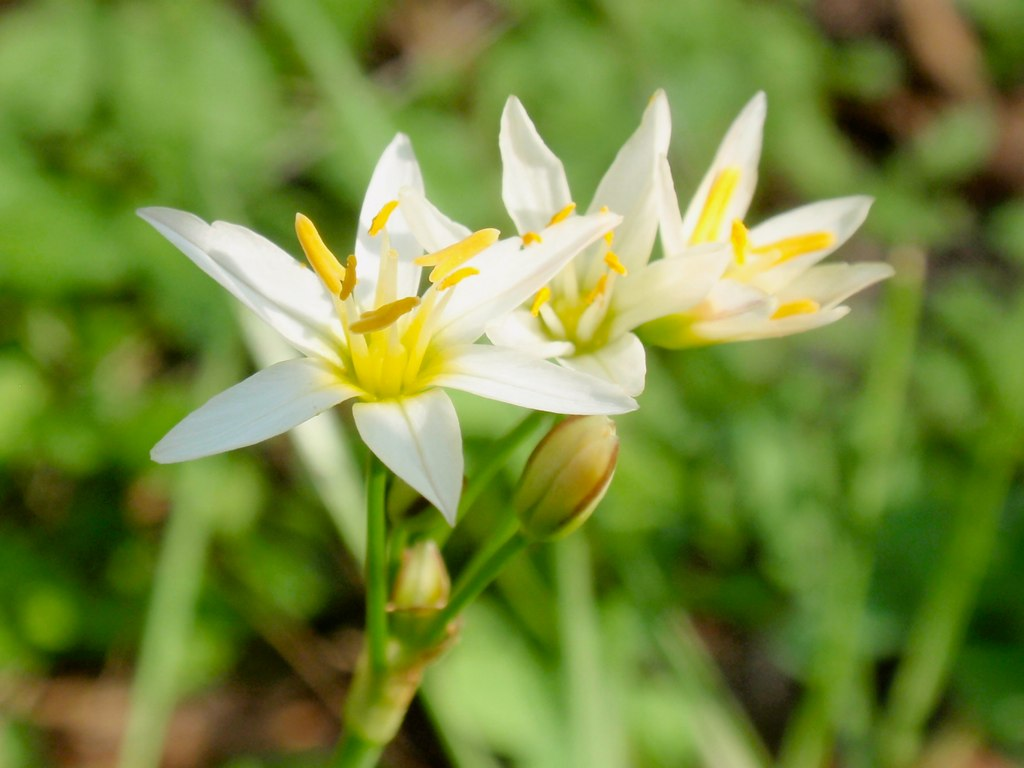
Nothoscordum bivalve.

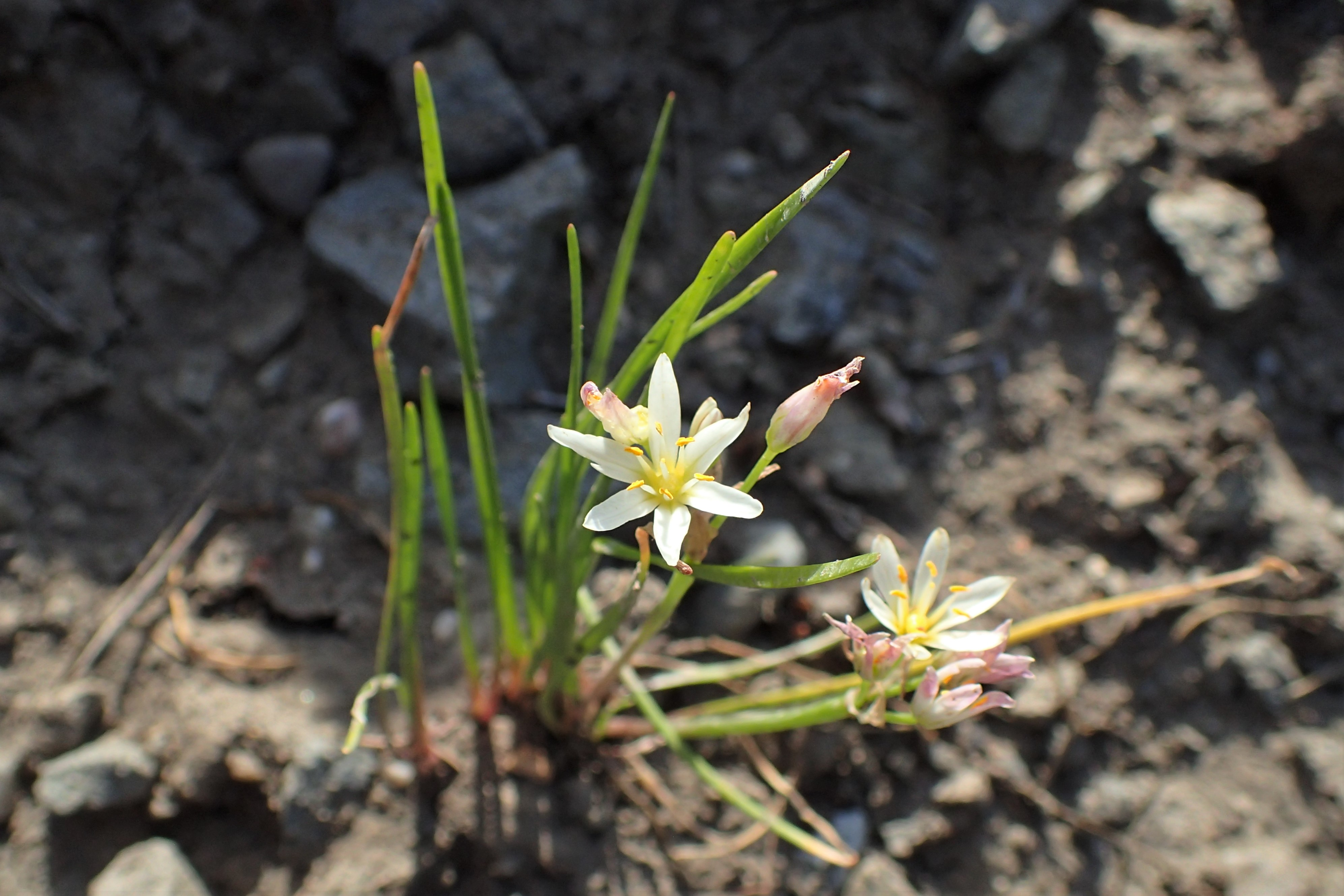
Nothoscordum bivalve in Jibou Botanical Garden.
