= Erinna gilliesioides =

Scientific classification
- Kingdom: Plantae
- Clade: Tracheophytes
- Clade: Angiosperms
- Clade: Monocots
- Order: Asparagales
- Family: Amaryllidaceae
- Subfamily: Allioideae
- Tribe: Gilliesieae
- Genus: Erinna; Phil
- Species: E. gilliesioides

Binomial name
- Erinna gilliesioides Phil.

Synonyms
- Leucocoryne gilliesioides (Phil.) Ravenna

Species of flowering plant

Erinna is a genus of perennial herbaceous geophytes in the flowering plant family Amaryllidaceae. It is native to Chile, South America. It is included in the tribe Gilliesieae, within the subfamily Allioideae. The genus is monotypic, with a single species, Erinna gilliesioides. It is relatively rare.

== Taxonomy ==
Erinna was described by Philippi in 1864 as a monotypic genus, based on Erinna gilliesioides. As such it was a genus within Alliaceae, and included in the phylogenetic construction of Gilliesieae in 1996. Although Ravenna (2000) proposed transferring it to Leucocoryne as Leucocoryne gilliesioides on morphological grounds, it was included separately by Chase et al. (2009) and hence the 2009 APGIII. Although the World Checklist lists Erinna as a synonym of Leucocoryne, Sassone et al. (2014) still consider its status uncertain.

In 2014 Sassone et al. proposed dividing the Gilliesieae into two separate tribes. Under their proposal, Erinna would remain in Gilliesieae s.s. rather than be transferred to the new tribe, Leucocorynae, as would be the case if transferred into Leucocoryne.

== Bibliography ==
- Philippi, RA (1864). "Plantarum novarum Chilensium, inclusis quibusdam Mendocinis et Patagonicis". Linnaea. 33: 1–308.
- Fay, Michael F.; Chase, Mark W. (August 1996). "Resurrection of Themidaceae for the Brodiaea alliance, and Recircumscription of Alliaceae, Amaryllidaceae and Agapanthoideae". Taxon. 45 (3): 441–451. doi:10.2307/1224136. JSTOR 1224136.
- Ravenna, P. F. (2000). "New or noteworthy Leucocoryne species (Alliaceae)". Onira. 4: 3–10.
- Sassone, Agostina B.; Arroyo-Leuenberger, Silvia C.; Giussani, Liliana M. (2014). "Nueva Circunscripción de la tribu Leucocoryneae (Amaryllidaceae, Allioideae)". Darwiniana. Nueva Serie. 2 (2): 197–206. doi:10.14522/darwiniana/2014.22.584. ISSN 0011-6793.
- Chase, Mark W.; Reveal, James L.; Fay, Michael F. (October 2009). "A subfamilial classification for the expanded asparagalean families Amaryllidaceae, Asparagaceae and Xanthorrhoeaceae". Botanical Journal of the Linnean Society. 161 (2): 132–136. doi:10.1111/j.1095-8339.2009.00999.x.
- Angiosperm Phylogeny Group (2009), "An update of the Angiosperm Phylogeny Group classification for the orders and families of flowering plants: APG III", Botanical Journal of the Linnean Society, 161 (2): 105–121, doi:10.1111/j.1095-8339.2009.00996.x, hdl:10654/18083
- "Quick Search". World Checklist of Selected Plant Families. Royal Botanic Gardens, Kew.
- Erinna. The Plant List
