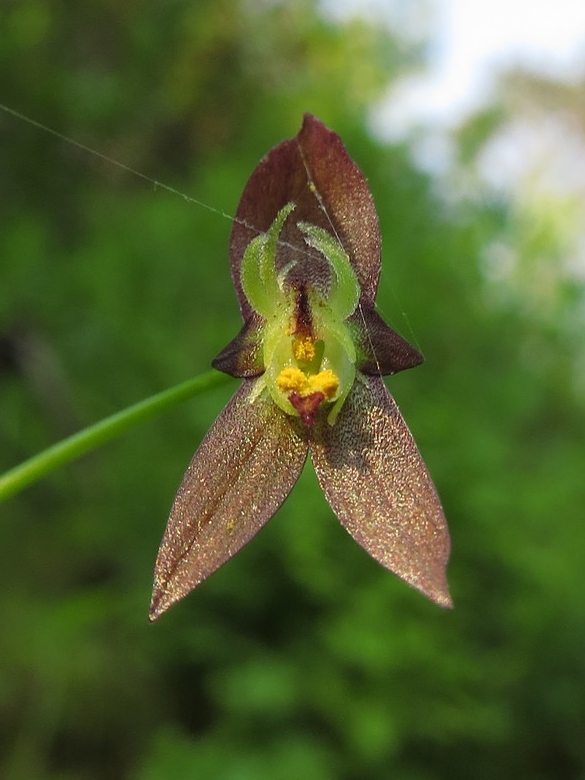
- Gilliesia graminea

Scientific classification
- Kingdom: Plantae
- Clade: Tracheophytes
- Clade: Angiosperms
- Clade: Monocots
- Order: Asparagales
- Family: Amaryllidaceae
- Subfamily: Allioideae
- Tribe: Gilliesieae
- Genus: Gilliesia; Lindl.

Type species
- Gilliesia graminea Lindl.

Synonyms
- Ancrumia Harv. ex Baker; Gethyum Phil.; Solaria Phil.; Symea Baker

= Gilliesia =

Genus of flowering plants

Gilliesia is a genus in the family Amaryllidaceae. The genus is native to Chile and Argentina.

== Species ==
As of August 2024, Plants of the World Online accepted these species:

- Gilliesia atropurpurea (Phil.) M.F.Fay & Christenh. – central Chile
- Gilliesia attenuata (Ravenna) M.F.Fay & Christenh. – central Chile to Argentina (Neuquén Province)
- Gilliesia brevicoalita (Ravenna) M.F.Fay & Christenh. – Chile (Maule Region)
- Gilliesia curacavina (Ravenna) M.F.Fay & Christenh. – Chile (Santiago Metropolitan Region)
- Gilliesia curicana Ravenna – Chile (Maule Region)
- Gilliesia cuspidata (Harv. ex Baker) M.F.Fay & Christenh. – Chile (Coquimbo Region)
- Gilliesia dimera Ravenna – Chile (Maule Region)
- Gilliesia graminea Lindl. – central Chile, Argentina (Mendoza Province)
- Gilliesia isopetala Ravenna – Chile (O'Higgins Region)
- Gilliesia miersioides (Phil.) M.F.Fay & Christenh. – central Chile
- Gilliesia monophylla Reiche – Chile (Maule to Biobío regions)
- Gilliesia montana Poepp. & Endl. – Chile (Maule to La Araucanía regions)
- Gilliesia nahuelbutae Ravenna – Chile (Biobío Region)

== Bibliography ==
- Rudall, P. J.; Bateman, R. M.; Fay, M. F.; Eastman, A. (1 December 2002). "Floral anatomy and systematics of Alliaceae with particular reference to Gilliesia, a presumed insect mimic with strongly zygomorphic flowers". American Journal of Botany. 89 (12): 1867–1883. doi:10.3732/ajb.89.12.1867. PMID 21665616.
- Lindley, John (1826). "Gilliesia graminea". Edwards' Botanical Register. 12: t. 992.
