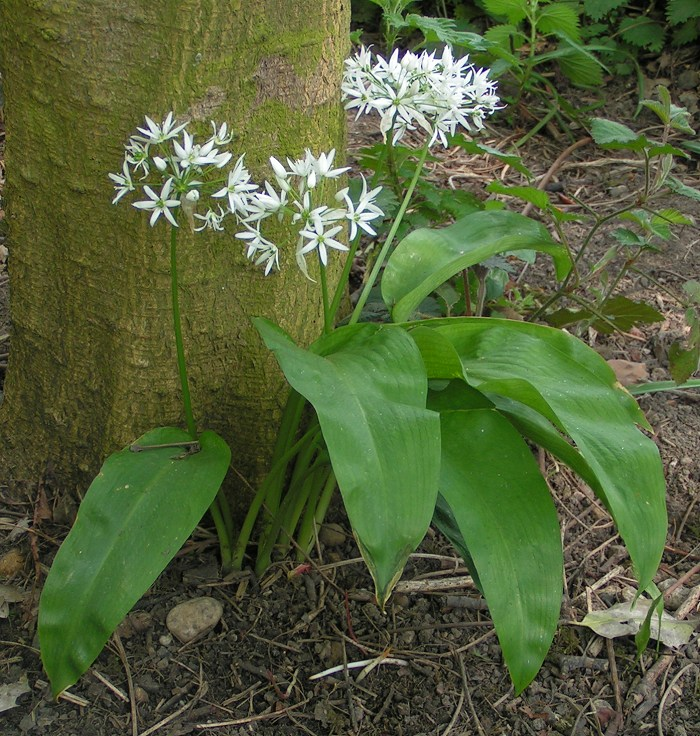
- Allium ursinum

Scientific classification
- Kingdom: Plantae
- Clade: Tracheophytes
- Clade: Angiosperms
- Clade: Monocots
- Order: Asparagales
- Family: Amaryllidaceae
- Subfamily: Allioideae; Herb.

Type genus
- Allium L.

Tribes
- Allieae; Gilliesieae; Leucocoryneae; Tulbaghieae

Synonyms
- Alliaceae J.G. Agardh (1858); Batsch ex Borkh. (1797) (Note: While the name Alliaceae is generally attributed to Agardh, there is prior precedence for Batsch (Dispos. Gen. Pl. Jenens.: 50. 1786). This was validated by Borkhausen (1797). Since suprageneric nomenclature officially commences on 4 Aug 1789 (Jussieu, Gen. Pl.) Alliaceae should be more correctly referenced as Alliaceae Batsch ex Borkh., Bot. Wörterb. 1: 15. 1797, nom. cons.)

= Allioideae =

Subfamily of flowering plants

Allioideae is a subfamily of monocot flowering plants in the family Amaryllidaceae, order Asparagales. It was formerly treated as a separate family, Alliaceae. The subfamily name is derived from the generic name of the type genus, Allium. It is composed of about 18 genera.

== Description ==
The subfamily contains both well-known garden plants and weeds, such as Nothoscordum.

== Taxonomy ==
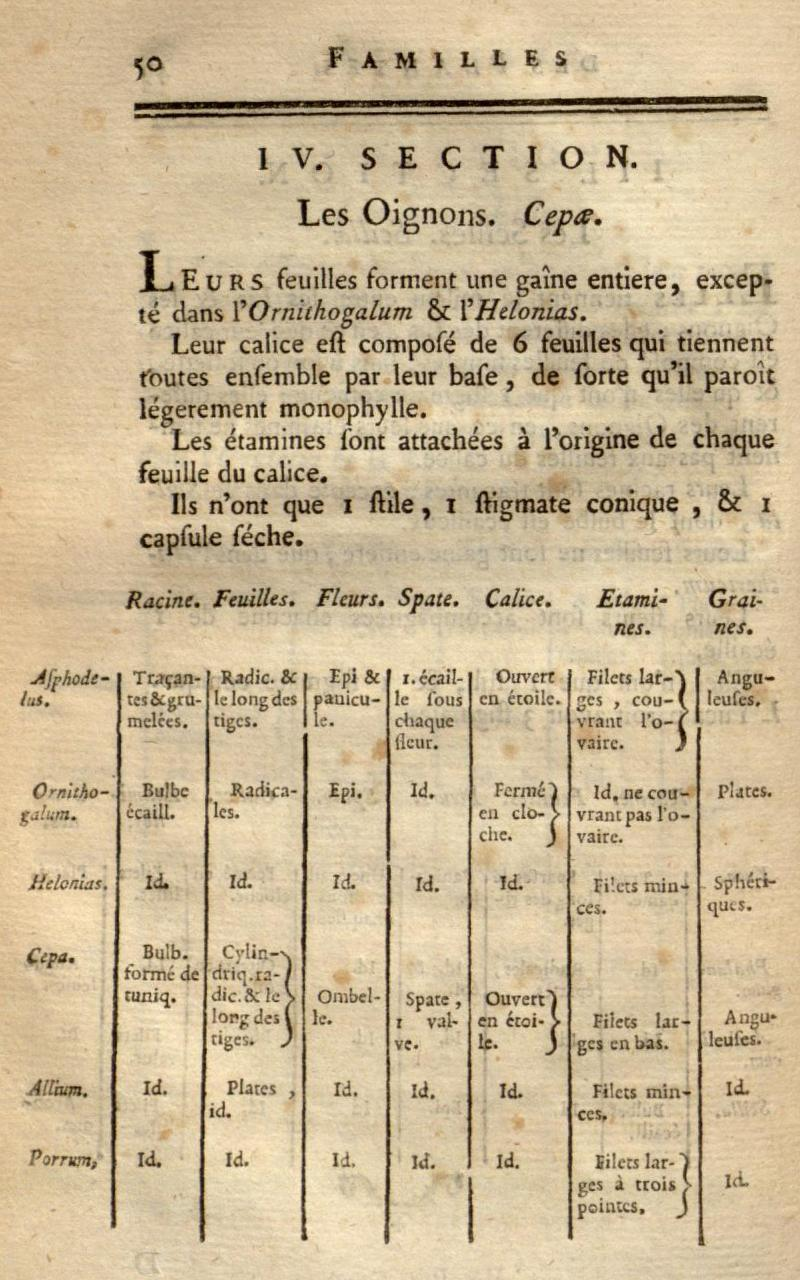
Michel Adanson's description of Cepae 1763

Original descriptions of Alliaceae

Batsch 1786

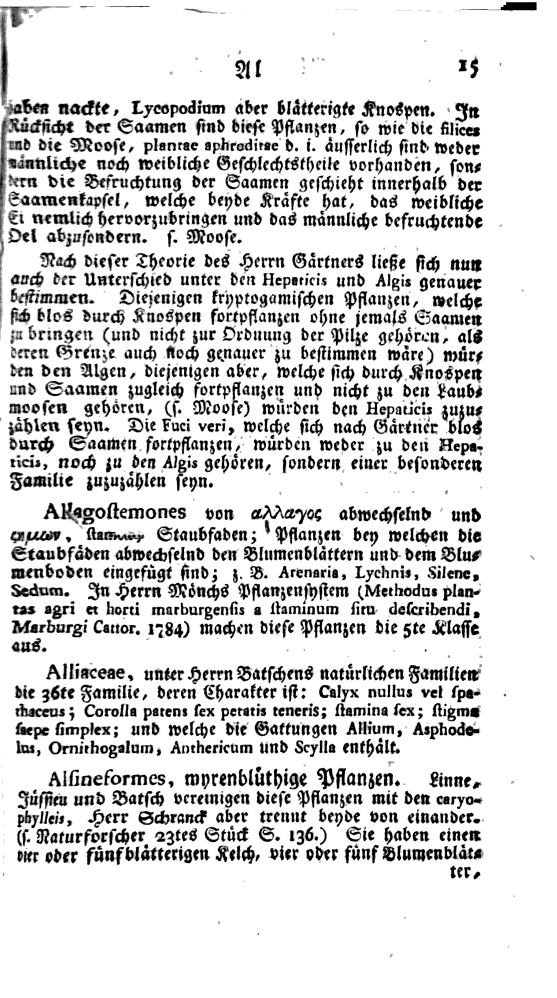
Borkhausen 1797

When Linnaeus formerly described the type genus Allium in his Species Plantarum in 1753, thirty species had this name. He placed Allium in a grouping he referred to as Hexandria monogynia (i.e. six stamens and one pistil) containing 51 genera in all.

In 1763, Michel Adanson, who proposed the concept of families of plants, included Allium and related genera as a grouping within Liliaceae as Section IV, Les Oignons (Onions), or Cepae in Latin. De Jussieu is officially recognised as the first formal establishment of the suprageneric grouping into families (Ordo) in 1789. In this system Allium was one of fourteen genera in Ordo VI, Asphodeles (Asphodeli), of the third class (Stamina epigyna) of Monocots.

In 1786, the Allioideae were first described by their type genus as Alliaceae by Batsch. In 1797, after the appearance of the Jussieu system, this was validated by Borkhausen. Jean Henri Jaume Saint-Hilaire (1805), who developed the concept of Amaryllidaceae, continued Jussieu's treatment of Allium under Asphodeli (which he considered synonymous with Adanson's Liliaceae and Jussieu's Asphodeli). He placed Allium in an unnamed monotypic section of Asphodeli defined as Fleurs en ombelle, racine bulbeuse. Calice à six parties egales (umbellate flowers, bulbous, calyx of six equal parts).

Subsequently, de Candolle reverted the family name back to Liliaceae from Asphodeli. He divided the Liliaceae into a series of Ordres, and the second ordre was named Asphodèles, based on Jussieus' family of that name, in which he placed Allium. The term 'Alliaceae' then reappeared in its subfamilial form, Allieae, in Dumortier's Florula Belgica (1827), with six genera.

The 'Alliaceae' have been treated as Allieae within the family Liliaceae (or Aspholecaceae, a partial synonym) by most authorities since. In 1830, Lindley, the first English systematist, considered Alliaceae (Note: Lindley attributed Alliaceae to Link rather than Dumortier, referencing Alliaceae Link Handb. I: 152 (1829)) to be part of the tribe Asphodeleae, separating them from the Liliaceae as he understood them. He also described the closely related Gilliesieae (p. 274), which with the Allieae would later migrate to Amaryllidaceae. By the time of his final work in 1846 he realised that the Liliaceae, which had expanded greatly, were very diverse in circumscription with many subdivisions, and were already paraphyletic ("catch-all"). He absorbed Asphodeleae into this family and created a suborder of Scilleae, which he considered equivalent to Link's Allieae.

By the time of the next major British (though written in Latin) classification, that of Bentham and Hooker (1883), the Allieae had become one of 20 tribes within Liliaceae. The Allieae included Lindley's Gilliesieae as one of its four subtribes. Similarly in the German language literature, Engler's classification (1903) treated Allieae and Gilliesiae as tribes of subfamily Allioideae, within Liliaceae.

=== Modern era ===
In the early 20th century, doubts were expressed about the placement of the alliaceous genera within Liliaceae, based solely on the position of the ovary. Lotsy was the first taxonomist to propose separating them, and in his system he describes Alliaceae and Gilliesiaceae as new and separate families from Liliaceae (1911). This approach was later adopted by a number of other authorities, such as Dahlgren (1985) and Rahn (1998).

In 1926, John Hutchinson moved the tribes Allieae and Gilliesieaes from Liliaceae to the Amaryllidaceae, although this was not universally adopted. Thus, Allieae were variously treated as either Liliaceae, Amaryllidaceae, or Alliaceae. Further examination of the heterogeneity of the Liliaceae by Huber (1969) supported the removal of these two tribes, into Alliaceae and this family was treated as an independent entity from then onwards with the exception of Cronquist who reverted to a very broad concept of Liliaceae.

In 1985, Dahlgren, Clifford, and Yeo continuing the work of Huber, but with a more cladistic approach, defined the Alliaceae to include all of the genera that are now included in Allioideae (30 genera, 720 species), plus Agapanthus and a group of genera that are now placed in Themidaceae, or its equivalent, the subfamily Brodiaeoideae of Asparagaceae. They divided Alliaceae into three subfamilies: Agapanthoideae, Allioideae, and Gilliesioideae. Agapanthoideae consisted of two genera (Agapanthus and Tulbaghia). Allioideae contained two tribes, Brodiaeeae (ten genera) and a broadly defined Allieae, which they considered distinct enough to alternatively consider as subfamilies in their own right. Gilliesioideae was composed of about half of the genera now placed in Gilliesieae, the rest being assigned to Allieae.

=== Phylogenetic analyses ===
In 1996, a molecular phylogenetic study of the rbcL gene showed that Agapanthus was misplaced in Alliaceae, and the authors excluded it from the family. They also raised Brodiaeeae to family rank as Themidaceae. They reduced the tribe Allieae to two genera, Allium and Milula, and transferred the rest of Allieae to Gilliesieae. This is the circumscription which the Angiosperm Phylogeny Group accepted in the APG classification of 1998 and which later became known as Alliaceae sensu stricto.

In the APG II system of 2003, Alliaceae could be recognized sensu stricto or sensu lato, as mentioned above. Soon after the publication of APG II, the ICBN conserved the name Amaryllidaceae for the family that had been called Alliaceae sensu lato in APG II.

When the APG III system was published in 2009, the alternative circumscriptions were discontinued and Alliaceae was no longer recognized. Alliaceae sensu stricto became the subfamily Allioideae of Amaryllidaceae sensu lato. Some botanists have not strictly followed the Angiosperm Phylogeny Group and have recognized the smaller version of Alliaceae at family rank. Successive revisions of the Angiosperm Phylogeny Group (APG) classification have changed the circumscription of the family. In the 1998 version, Alliaceae were a distinct family; in the 2003 version, combining the Alliaceae with the Agapanthaceae and the Amaryllidaceae sensu stricto was recommended but optional; in the 2009 version, only the broad circumscription of the Amaryllidaceae is allowed, with the Alliaceae reduced to a subfamily, Allioideae.

Quite a few of the plants that were once included in family Alliaceae have been assigned to the subfamily Brodiaeoideae (rather than the subfamily Allioideae).

The largest genera are Allium (260–690 species), Nothoscordum (25), and Tulbaghia (22). Some of the generic limits are not clear. Ipheion, Nothoscordum, and possibly others are not monophyletic.

=== Subdivision ===
Allioideae is divided into four tribes: Allieae, Tulbaghieae, Gilliesieae and Leucocoryneae. The first three correspond to the three subfamilies under the older family Alliaceae (Alliodiae, Tulbaghioideae and Gilliesioideae). Leucocoryneae was added in 2014 by dividing Gilliesieae into two separate tribes, corresponding to the original tribes within Gilliesioideae, elevating Iphiae nom. nud. to tribe Leucocoryneae.

Allieae contains only one genus Allium (Milula is merged with Allium in the latest systems). Tulbaghieae contains two genera, Tulbaghia and Prototulbaghia. Gilliesieae and Leucocoryneae contain the remaining fifteen genera. Allieae is sister to a clade composed of Tulbaghieae and Gilliesieae.

==== Allieae ====
It is characterised by simple or prolific bulbs, sometimes with lateral rhizomes. Leaf sheaths are long, tepals are free and the corona is absent. Spathe is formed from 2–5 bracts. The style is positioned apical relative to the ovary. The ovary usually has two, four or numerous ovules per locule in two longitudinal rows. It has one genus, Allium, and over 500 species. It is distributed over all the Northern hemisphere.

==== Gilliesieae ====
Characterised by simple or prolific bulbs, sometimes with lateral rhizomes. Leaf sheaths long, tepals more or less fused and corona absent. Spathe formed from 1–2 bracts. Style more or less gynobasic. Ovary usually has two ovules per locule, side by side. Floral symmetry zygomorphic, septal nectaries absent. Nine genera native to South America.

==== Leucocoryneae ====
Characterised by simple or prolific bulbs, sometimes with lateral rhizomes. Leaf sheaths long, tepals more or less fused and corona absent. Spathe formed from 1–2 bracts. Style more or less gynobasic. Ovary usually has two ovules per locule, side by side. Floral symmetry actinomorphic, septal nectaries present. Six genera and 42 species, and endemic to South America with the exception of two species of Nothoscordum.

==== Tulbaghieae ====
Characterised by corm-shaped bulb or rhizome. Leaf sheaths short. Flowers possess a corona, pseudocorona or a fleshy perigonal ring. Two genera and about 25 species. Endemic to South Africa.

=== Genera ===
As of December 2014, the following eighteen genera are included in the Allioideae: (Note: Unless otherwise shown, genera are from the Angiosperm Phylogeny Website.)

Allieae

- Allium L. (includes Milula Prain)

Gilliesieae

- Ancrumia Harv. ex Baker
- Erinna Phil.
- Gethyum Phil.
- Gilliesia Lindl. (including Pabellonia Quezada & Martic. and Stemmatium Phil.)
- Miersia Lindl.
- Schickendantziella Looser
- Solaria Phil.
- Speea Loes.
- Trichlora Baker

Leucocoryneae

- Beauverdia Herter
- Ipheion Rafinesque
- Leucocoryne Lindl.
- Nothoscordum Kunth.
- Tristagma Poepp.
- Zoellnerallium Crosa (1975).

Tulbaghieae

- Tulbaghia L.
- Prototulbaghia Vosa

=== Former genera ===
The genera Androstephium, Bessera, Bloomeria, Brodiaea, Dandya, Dichelostemma, Jaimehintonia, Milla, Muilla, Petronymphe, Triteleia, and Triteleiopsis are now treated in the family Themidaceae (alt. Asparagaceae subfam. Brodiaeoideae). Petronymphe has been restored to Themidaceae from Anthericaceae (now a segregate of Agavaceae). Latace Phil. is included in Nothoscordum.

=== Phylogeny ===
- Subfamily Allioideae
  - - - Tribe Allieae (monogeneric, Allium)
      - - Tribe Tulbaghieae
        - Tribes Gilliesieae, Leucocoryneae

== Distribution ==
Global distribution corresponds to the tribal structure, with the Allieae confined to the Northern hemisphere (North America, North Africa, Europe and Asia), Tulbaghieae to South Africa, Gilliesieae to South America, and Leucocoryneae to South America with the exception of two species of Nothoscordum (N. bivalve, N. gracile) which extend to southern North America. Thus, fourteen of the total of 18 genera are endemic to temperate South America.

== Uses ==
Some of the species of Allium are important food plants for example onions (Allium cepa), chives (A. schoenoprasum), garlic (A. sativum and A. scordoprasum), and leeks (A. porrum). Species of Allium, Gilliesia, Ipheion, Leucocoryne, Nothoscordum, and Tulbaghia are cultivated as ornamentals.

== See also ==
- Glossary of plant morphology
- Glossary of botanical terms

== Bibliography ==
- "Linnaeus Sexual System". CronkLab. Biodiversity Research Centre, University of British Columbia.
- Fay, Michael F.; Hall, Tony (May 2007). "589. Gethyum atropurpureum". Curtis's Botanical Magazine. 24 (2): 121–126. doi:10.1111/j.1467-8748.2007.00573.x.
- Sassone, Agostina B.; Arroyo-Leuenberger, Silvia C.; Giussani, Liliana M. (2014). "Nueva Circunscripción de la tribu Leucocoryneae (Amaryllidaceae, Allioideae)". Darwiniana. Nueva Serie. 2 (2): 197–206. doi:10.14522/darwiniana/2014.22.584. ISSN 0011-6793.
- Amaryllidaceae J. St.-Hil. subfam. Alliodieae Herb. Laboratorio de Sistemática de Plantas vasculares, Instituto de Ecología y Ciencias Ambientales, Facultad de Ciencias, Universidad de la República – Uruguay

=== History ===
==== Early ====
- Linnaeus, C. (1753). Species Plantarum: exhibentes plantas rite cognitas, ad genera relatas, cum differentiis specificis, nominibus trivialibus, synonymis selectis, locis natalibus, secundum systema sexuale digestas. Stockholm: Impensis Laurentii Salvii. see Species Plantarum
- Adanson, Michel (1763). Familles des plantes. Paris: Vincent.

Table of 58 families, Part II: Page 1
Table of 1615 genera, Part II: Page 8

- Batsch, August Johann Georg Carl (1786). Dissertatio inauguralis botanica sistens dispositionem generum plantarum Jenensium. Jena: Litteris Hellerianis.
- Jussieu, Antoine Laurent de (1789). Genera Plantarum, secundum ordines naturales disposita juxta methodum in Horto Regio Parisiensi exaratam. Paris: apud viduam Herissant et Theophilum Barrois.
- Borkhausen, Moritz Balthasar (1797). Botanisches Wörterbuch oder Versuch einer Erklärung der vornehmsten Begriffe und Kunstwörter in der Botanik, 2 Volumes. Giessen: Georg Friedrich Heyer.
- Jaume Saint-Hilaire, Jean Henri (1805). Exposition de familles naturales. Paris: Treutel et Würtz.
- De Lamarck, Jean-Baptiste; De Candolle, Augustin Pyramus (1815). Flore française ou descriptions succinctes de toutes les plantes qui croissent naturellement en France disposées selon une nouvelle méthode d'analyse; et précédées par un exposé des principes élémentaires de la botanique (vol. III) (3 ed.). Paris: Desray.
- Dumortier, Barthélemy Charles Joseph (1827). Florula Belgica, operis majoris prodromus. Tournay: Casterman.
- Link, Johann Heinrich Friedrich (1829). Handbuch zur Erkennung der nutzbarsten und am häufigsten vorkommenden Gewächse. Berlin: Haude und Spener.
- Lindley, John (1830). An introduction to the natural system of botany : or, A systematic view of the organisation, natural affinities, and geographical distribution, of the whole vegetable kingdom : together with the uses of the most important species in medicine, the arts, and rural or domestic economy. London: Longman.
- Lindley, John (1846). The Vegetable Kingdom: or, The structure, classification, and uses of plants, illustrated upon the natural system. London: Bradbury.
- Bentham, G.; Hooker, J.D. (1883). Genera plantarum ad exemplaria imprimis in herbariis kewensibus servata definita. London: L Reeve & Co.

==== Twentieth century ====
- Cronquist, Arthur (1981). An integrated system of classification of flowering plants. New York: Columbia University Press. ISBN 9780231038805.
- Cronquist, Arthur (1988). The evolution and classification of flowering plants (2 ed.). Bronx: New York Botanical Garden. ISBN 978-0893273323.
- Dahlgren, Rolf M.T.; Clifford, H. Trevor; Yeo, Peter F. (1985). The families of the monocotyledons. Berlin: Springer-Verlag. ISBN 978-3-642-64903-5.
- Engler, Adolf, ed. (1903). Syllabus der Pflanzenfamilien : eine Übersicht über das gesamte Pflanzensystem mit Berücksichtigung der Medicinal- und Nutzpflanzen nebst einer Übersicht über die Florenreiche und Florengebiete der Erde zum Gebrauch bei Vorlesungen und Studien über specielle und medicinisch-pharmaceutische Botanik (3 ed.). Berlin: Gebrüder Borntraeger Verlag.
- Fay, Michael F.; Chase, Mark W. (August 1996). "Resurrection of Themidaceae for the Brodiaea alliance, and Recircumscription of Alliaceae, Amaryllidaceae and Agapanthoideae". Taxon. 45 (3): 441–451. Bibcode:1996Taxon..45..441F. doi:10.2307/1224136. JSTOR 1224136.
- Huber, Herbert F.J. (1969). "Die Samenmerkmale und Verwandtschaftsverhältnisse der Liliiflorae". Mitt. Bot. Staatssamml. [Mitteilungen der Botanischen Staatssammlung München]. 8: 219–538.
- Hutchinson, John (1934). The families of flowering plants, arranged according to a new system based on their probable phylogeny. 2 vols. Volume 1: Monocotyledonae 1926, Volume 2: Dicotyledonae.
- Kubitzki, K., ed. (1998). The families and genera of vascular plants. Vol.3. Berlin, Germany: Springer-Verlag. ISBN 978-3-540-64060-8.
  - Rahn K. Alliaceae. pp. 70–78
- Lotsy, J. P. (1911). Vorträge über botanische stammesgeschichte, gehalten an der Reichsuniversität zu Leiden. Ein lehrbuch der pflanzensystematick. III Cormophyta Siphonogamia. Jena: Gustav Fischer.

=== Taxonomy ===
- Chase, Mark W.; Reveal, James L. & Fay, Michael F. (2009). "A subfamilial classification for the expanded asparagalean families Amaryllidaceae, Asparagaceae and Xanthorrhoeaceae". Botanical Journal of the Linnean Society. 161 (2): 132–136. doi:10.1111/j.1095-8339.2009.00999.x.
- Meerow, Alan W.; Reveal, James L.; Snijman, Deirdre A. & Dutilh, Julie H. (November 2007). "(1793) Proposal to conserve the name Amaryllidaceae against Alliaceae, a "superconservation" proposal". Taxon. 56 (4): 1299–1300. Bibcode:2007Taxon..56.1299M. doi:10.2307/25065925. JSTOR 25065925.
- Reveal, James L. (November 1998). "Comments on Art. 14, Footnote 2: First Place of Publication for Seed Plant Family Names". Taxon. 47 (4): 851–856. Bibcode:1998Taxon..47..851R. doi:10.2307/1224191. JSTOR 1224191.
