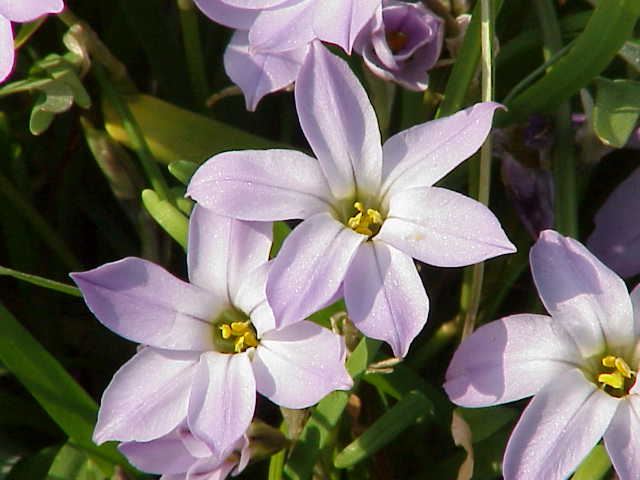
- Ipheion uniflorum

Scientific classification
- Kingdom: Plantae
- Clade: Embryophytes
- Clade: Tracheophytes
- Clade: Angiosperms
- Clade: Monocots
- Order: Asparagales
- Family: Amaryllidaceae
- Subfamily: Allioideae
- Tribe: Gilliesieae
- Genus: Ipheion; Raf.

Type species
- Ipheion uniflorum (Graham) Raf.

Species
- 3; see text

= Ipheion =

Genus of flowering plants

The flowering plant genus Ipheion (starflower, spring starflower) belongs to Allioideae, a subfamily of the family Amaryllidaceae. It includes three species native to southern Brazil, northeastern Argentina, and Uruguay.

== Description ==
They are small bulbous perennials with narrow grass-like leaves and honey-scented star-shaped flowers in spring, usually in shades of white or pale blue. The genus occurs naturally in Argentina, Uruguay, and southern Brazil, although Ipheion uniflorum has naturalized elsewhere.

== Taxonomy ==
=== History ===
The genus was originally described in 1836 by Constantine Samuel Rafinesque, based on Ipheion uniflorum, separating it from Milla uniflora Graham (now Tristagma). The original description was unifloral inflorescences with white flowers, spathe formed by one bifid bract, staminal filaments independently fused to the perigonial tube and the fruit being a clavate trilocular capsule.

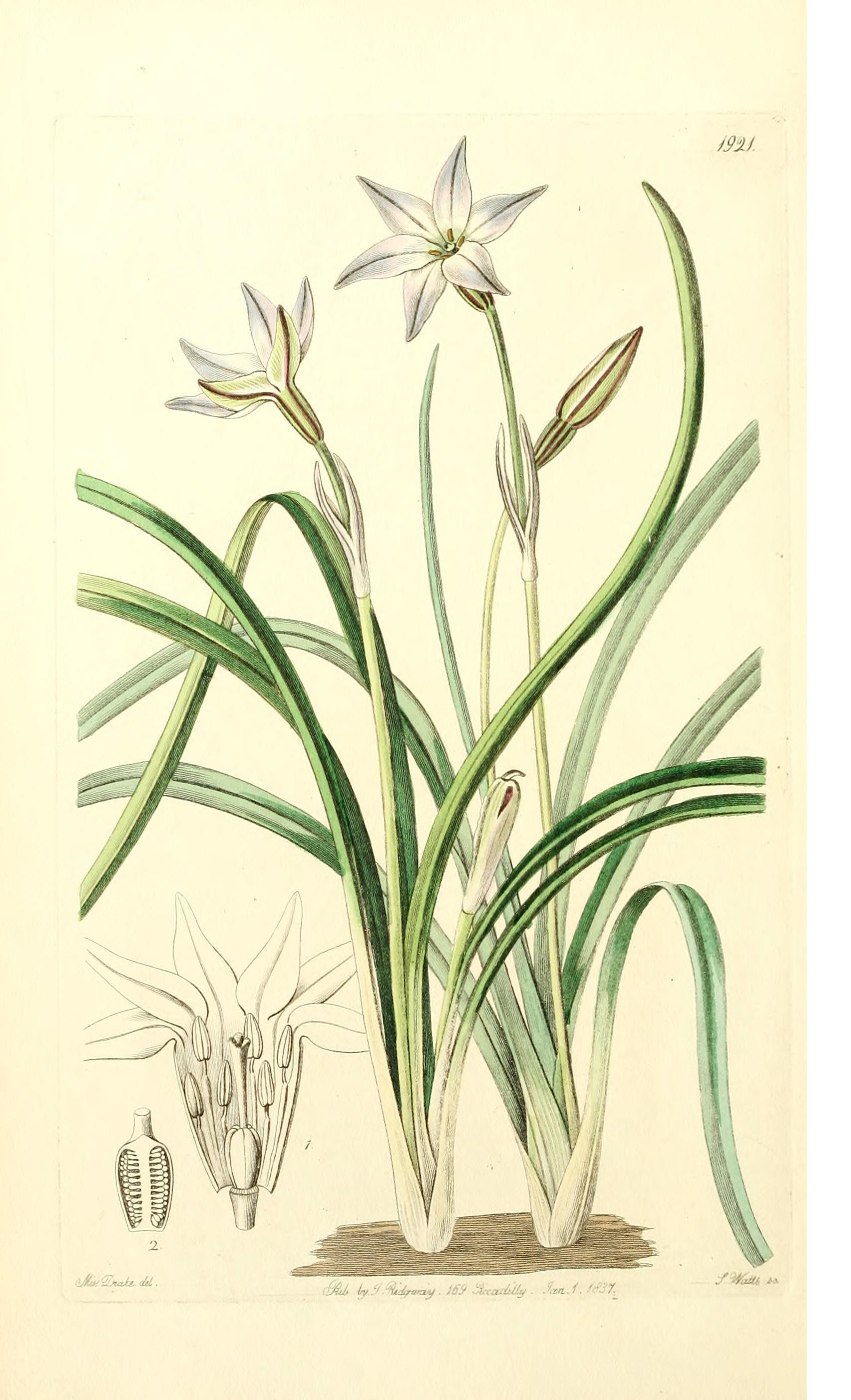
Ipheion uniflorum, by John Lindley 1837 (as Triteleia uniflorum)

The name then disappeared for more than a century and at various times the species have been included under other related genera (Milla, Tristagma, Brodiaea (including Hookera), Leucocoryne, Nothoscordum, Triteleia and Beauverdia). Several of these genera are now in a completely different but related family (Themidaceae). The closest of these genera to Ipheion is actually Tristagma. For instance in 1837, at the same time as Rafinesque's description, Ipheion uniflorum was described by John Lindley in the Botanical Register as Triteleia uniflora Lindl. (see illustration)

In 1908, Beauverd placed Ipheion uniflorum in a new section of Nothoscordum, Nothoscordum section uniflora Beauv. as Nothoscordum uniflorum Baker (without attributing Rafinesque), along with four other species. However the name Ipheion did not appear again until 1943. In that year Herter elevated Nothoscordum section uniflora to the rank of genus, as Beauverdia. Later that same year Stearn pointed out that the name Ipheion had precedence and described the genus with nine species under that name.

There has been constant uncertainty as to the limits of the genus. At one stage it included 23 species in two sections, at other times it was completely absorbed into other genera such as Tristagma. Those species with yellow flowers were returned to Nothoscordum. In 1972 Guaglianone separated it again from Tristagma and divided it into two sections, Hirtellum and Ipheion. At that time it consisted of eight species in Argentina, Uruguay, southern Brazil and central Chile.

=== Familial circumscription ===
Lindley included Ipheion (as Triteleia) under the family Liliaceae, a pattern that remained until 1926, when Hutchinson moved parts of that family to Amaryllidaceae, as tribe Gilesieae, an arrangement that has largely persisted since.

=== Phylogenetics ===
In 1996, a molecular phylogenetic study of the rbcL gene created the Gilliesioideae, as one of three subfamilies within Alliaceae. As phylogenetically constructed, Gilliesioideae (Gilliesioideae (Lindl.) Am., Botany: 134. 1832 - Gilliesieae Lindl. in Bot. Reg.: ad t. 992. 1826.) consisted of those New World Alliaceae not included in the other two subfamilies, which included both the former Gilliesieae together with Ipheion, Leucocoryne, Nothoscordum, and Tristagma. This is the circumscription which the Angiosperm Phylogeny Group (APG) accepted in the APG classification of 1998 and which later became known as Alliaceae sensu stricto (s.s.).

This construction of Gilliesioideae, implicitly recognised that it was composed of two groups or tribes, informally referred to as Ipheieae and Gilliesieae. The Ipheieae were actinomorphic, and included Ipheion, Nothoscordum, Leucocoryne s.l. (including Pabellonia and Stemmatium). Further phylogenetic analysis revealed that Ipheion was not monophyletic but rather biphyletic with some species clustering with Tristagma, and others with Nothoscordum (Fay 2006) although the division into sections was later supported. Research published in 2010 suggests that although related to genera such as Tristagma and Nothoscordum, it is a distinct genus of 3 species. However, other sources do not recognize the genus, placing all the Ipheion species in Tristagma.

Ipheion section Hirtellum was raised to genus rank in 2014 under the older name of Beauverdia, with four species found in Argentina, southern Brazil, and Uruguay. This corresponds to Group 3 of Sassone et al. 2013. This leaves Ipheion section Ipheion representing the genus, but further work is required. This cluster (Group 2 in the cladistic analysis of Sassone et al. 2013) which clusters with Tristagma may either be an independent genus, or a section of the latter genus. These are the three species listed here.

=== Species ===
Three species are accepted.

- Ipheion recurvifolium (C.H.Wright) Traub – northeastern Argentina, southern Brazil, and Uruguay
- Ipheion tweedieanum (Baker) Traub – northeastern Argentina and Uruguay
- Ipheion uniflorum (Graham) Raf. – spring starflower, north-central Argentina and Uruguay

==== Species formerly placed in this genus ====
Other species formerly placed in Ipheion have been transferred to Nothoscordum or Tristagma:

- Ipheion ameghinoi (Speg.) Traub = Tristagma ameghinoi (Speg.) Speg.
- Ipheion bivalve (Hook. ex Lindl.) Traub = Tristagma bivalve (Hook. ex Lindl.) Traub
- Ipheion brevipes (Kuntze) Traub = Tristagma brevipes (Kuntze) Traub
- Ipheion circinatum (Sandwith) Traub = Tristagma circinatum (Sandwith) Traub
- Ipheion dialystemon Guagl. = Nothoscordum dialystemon (Guagl.) Crosa
- Ipheion felipponei (Beauverd) Traub = Nothoscordum felipponei Beauverd
- Ipheion gracile (Phil.) Traub = Tristagma gracile (Phil.) Traub
- Ipheion hirtellum (Kunth) Traub = Nothoscordum hirtellum (Kunth) Herter
- Ipheion lloydiiflorum (Beauverd) Traub = Nothoscordum vittatum (Griseb.) Ravenna
- Ipheion lorentzii (Herter) Traub = Nothoscordum hirtellum subsp. lorentzii (Herter) Ravenna
- Ipheion nivale (Poepp.) Traub = Tristagma nivale Poepp.
- Ipheion patagonicum (Baker) Traub = Tristagma patagonicum (Baker) Traub
- Ipheion poeppigianum (Gay) Traub = Tristagma poeppigianum (Gay) Traub
- Ipheion porrifolium (Poepp.) Traub = Tristagma porrifolium (Poepp.) Traub
- Ipheion recurvifolium (C.H.Wright) Traub = Tristagma sessile (Phil.) Traub
- Ipheion sellowianum (Kunth) Traub = Nothoscordum felipponei Beauverd
- Ipheion setaceum (Baker) Traub = Nothoscordum setaceum (Baker) Ravenna
- Ipheion spegazzinii (Macloskie) Traub = Tristagma patagonicum (Baker) Traub
- Ipheion subsessile (Beauverd) Traub = Nothoscordum hirtellum subsp. hirtellum (Kunth) Herter
- Ipheion violaceum (Kunth) Traub = Tristagma bivalve (Hook. ex Lindl.) Traub
- Ipheion viridius (Killip) Traub = Tristagma patagonicum (Baker) Traub
- Ipheion vittatum (Griseb.) Traub = Nothoscordum vittatum (Griseb.) Ravenna

== Uses ==
Ipheion uniflorum is widely used as an ornamental garden plant in the Americas, Africa, Australia and Europe.

== Bibliography ==
=== General ===
- Howard, Thad M. (2001). Bulbs: From Warm Climates. Austin: University of Texas. ISBN 978-0292731264.
- RHS A-Z encyclopedia of garden plants. United Kingdom: Dorling Kindersley. 2008. p. 1136. ISBN 978-1405332965.
- Kamenetsky, Rina & Okubo, Hiroshi, eds. (2012). Ornamental Geophytes: From Basic Science to Sustainable Production. CRC Press. ISBN 978-1-4398-4924-8.

==== Systematics ====
- Rafinesque, Constantine Samuel (1836). The Synoptical Flora Telluriana, With new Natural Classes, Orders and families: containing the 2000 New or revised Genera and Species of Trees, Palms, Shrubs, Vines, Plants, Lilies, Grasses, Ferns, Algas, Fungi, & c. from North and South America, Polynesia, Australia, Asia Europe and Africa, omitted or mistaken by the authors, that were observed or ascertained, described or revised, collected or figured, between 1796 and 1836. Philadelphia: H. Probasco.
- Hutchinson, John (1926). The families of flowering plants, arranged according to a new system based on their probable phylogeny. Volume 1: Monocotyledonae (1 ed.). Macmillan.
- Hutchinson, J (1939). "The tribe Gilliesieae of Amaryllidaceae". Herbertia. 6: 136–145.
- Stearn, W.T. (September 1943). "The Welsh Onion and the Ever-ready Onion". The Gardeners' Chronicle. Third Series. 114: 86–88.
- Huber, Herbert F.J. (1969). "Die Samenmerkmale und Verwandtschaftsverhältnisse der Liliiflorae". Mitt. Bot. Staatssamml. [Mitteilungen der Botanischen Staatssammlung München]. 8: 219–538.
- Dahlgren, Rolf M.T.; Clifford, H. Trevor; Yeo, Peter F. (1985). The families of the monocotyledons. Berlin: Springer-Verlag. ISBN 978-3-642-64903-5.
- Fay, M.F. & Chase, M.W. (1996). "Resurrection of Themidaceae for the Brodiaea alliance, and recircumscription of Alliaceae, Amaryllidaceae and Agapanthoideae". Taxon. 45 (3): 441–451. doi:10.2307/1224136. JSTOR 1224136.
- Angiosperm Phylogeny Group (1998). "An ordinal classification for the families of flowering plants". Annals of the Missouri Botanical Garden. 85 (4): 531–53. doi:10.2307/2992015. JSTOR 2992015.
- Fay, M.F.; Rudall, P.J. & Chase, M.W. (2006). "Molecular Studies of Subfamily Gilliesioideae (Alliaceae)". Aliso. 22: 367–371. doi:10.5642/aliso.20062201.30.
- Chase, Mark W.; Reveal, James L. & Fay, Michael F. (October 2009). "A subfamilial classification for the expanded asparagalean families Amaryllidaceae, Asparagaceae and Xanthorrhoeaceae". Botanical Journal of the Linnean Society. 161 (2): 132–136. doi:10.1111/j.1095-8339.2009.00999.x.

=== Ipheion ===
- Sassone, Agostina B.; Giussani, Liliana M. & Guaglianone, Encarnación Rosa (30 April 2013). "Multivariate studies of Ipheion (Amaryllidaceae, Allioideae) and related genera". Plant Systematics and Evolution. 299 (8): 1561–1575. Bibcode:2013PSyEv.299.1561S. doi:10.1007/s00606-013-0819-5. hdl:11336/18970. S2CID 1843811.
- Guaglianone, E.R. (1972). "Sinopsis de las especies de Ipheion Raf. y Nothoscordum Kunth (Liliáceas) de Entre Ríos y regiones vecinas". Darwiniana. 17: 159–242. JSTOR 23215044.
- Traub, H.P. & Moldenke, H.N. (1955). "The genus Ipheion: diagnosis, key to species and synonymy". Plant Life (Stanford). 11: 125–130.
- "Ipheion", World Checklist of Selected Plant Families, Royal Botanic Gardens, Kew
- "Ipheion". The Plant List.
- "IPNI Plant Name Query Results for Ipheion". The International Plant Names Index.
- Souza, L.G.R; Crosa, O. & Guerra, M. (2010), "Karyological circumscription of Ipheion Rafinesque (Gilliesioideae, Alliaceae)", Plant Systematics and Evolution, 287 (3–4): 119–27, Bibcode:2010PSyEv.287..119S, doi:10.1007/s00606-010-0304-3, S2CID 21914243
- Vigneron, Pascal. "Ipheion". Amaryllidaceae.org (in French). Archived from the original on 6 February 2015.
- Stearn, W.T. (August 1943). "Ipheion uniflorum (Syns. Triteleia, Milla, Brodiaea and Beauverdia uniflora)". The Gardeners' Chronicle. Third Series. 114: 60–61.
- Keator, Glenn (1993). "Ipheion". Jepson Herbaria, University of California, Berkeley.
- "Spring Starflower; or, Springstar". Paghat's Garden. Archived from the original on March 14, 2004.

=== Related genera ===
- Sassone, Agostina B.; Giussani, Liliana M. & Guaglianone, Encarnación R. (1 July 2014). "Beauverdia, a Resurrected Genus of Amaryllidaceae (Allioideae, Gilliesieae)". Systematic Botany. 39 (3): 767–775. doi:10.1600/036364414X681527. hdl:11336/19039. S2CID 86287897.
- Herter, W.G. (1943). "Beauverdia genus novum Liliacearum". Boissiera. 7: 505–512.
- Beauverd, Gustave Beauverd (1908). "Nouvelles espèces uruguayennes du genre Nothoscordum Kunth". Bulletin de l'Herbier Boissier. Second Series. VIII: 993–1007.
