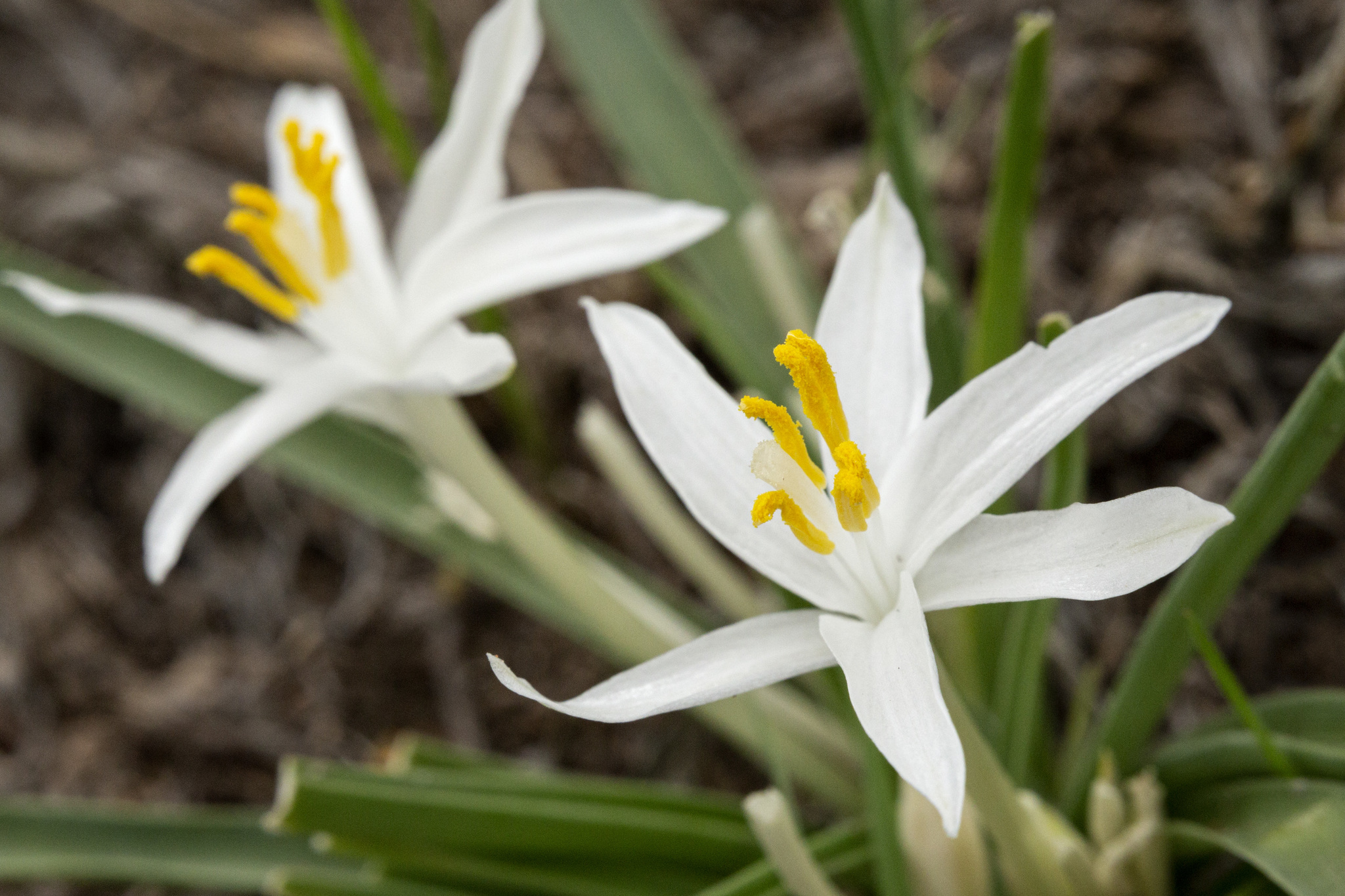
- Close up of flowers growing in Pawnee National Grassland, Colorado

Conservation status
- Secure (NatureServe)

Scientific classification
- Kingdom: Plantae
- Clade: Tracheophytes
- Clade: Angiosperms
- Clade: Monocots
- Order: Asparagales
- Family: Asparagaceae
- Subfamily: Agavoideae
- Tribe: Anthericeae
- Genus: Leucocrinum; Nutt. ex A.Gray
- Species: L. montanum

Binomial name
- Leucocrinum montanum Nutt. ex A.Gray
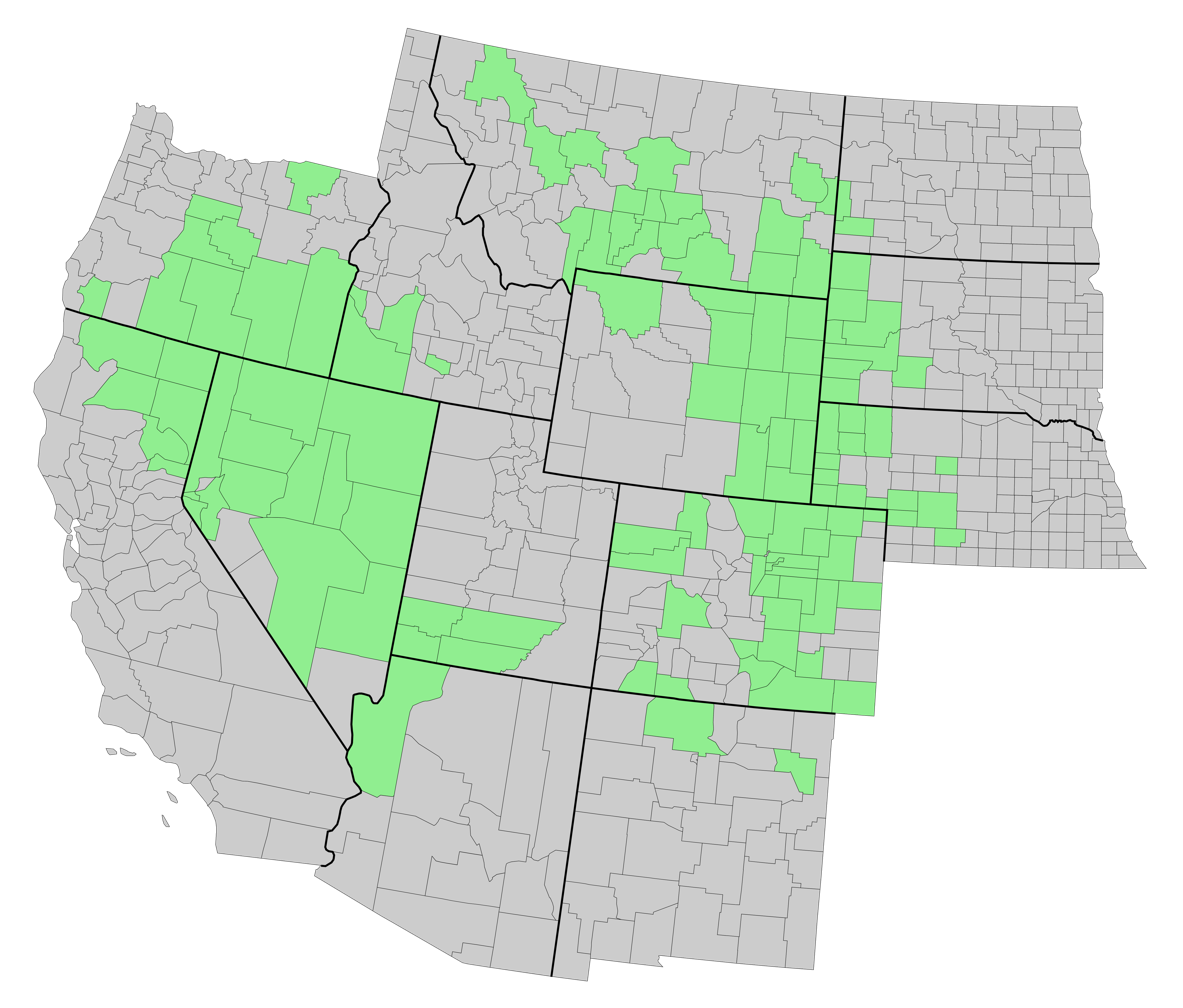
- The county level distributions of Leucocrinum montanum in western North America

Synonyms
- Leucrinis Raf.

= Leucocrinum =

Genus of flowering plants in the asparagus family

Leucocrinum montanum, commonly known as the common starlily, sandlily, or mountain lily, is the only species in the monotypic genus Leucocrinum, which was placed in the asparagus family in 2009. It is a common and widespread early spring wildflower on the shortgrass prairie, the central and southern Rocky Mountains, and the Intermountain West.

It is a low growing plant, no more than 10 centimeters (4 in) tall. The common starlily's flowers are also close to the ground with a floral tube that extends underground. The seed capsule develops beneath the surface of the soil with several different theories as to how the seeds are then distributed.

== Description ==
The common starlily is a small herbaceous plant reaching just 5 to 10 centimeters (2 to 4 in) in height. Plants consist of a stemless tuft of narrow, hairless, grass-like leaves that may reach 10–20 cm (4–8 in) in length and just 2–8 millimeters in width. The edges of the leaves are slightly white in color and they have a U-shaped cross section. The base of each leaf tuft is surrounded by a membranous sheath. Underground the plant has a short caudex, also called a crown, that is usually about 5 cm (2 in) under the soil surface. The roots resemble fleshy strings growing out from a central point and are light gray to tan in color. They are geophytes, a plant that avoids unfavorable conditions by dying back to their fleshy roots for most of the year, with its leaves disappearing by early summer.

Starlily is one of the best known early spring Rocky Mountain wildflowers. Its flowers are stemless, like the leaves, but grow from an underground umbel-like flower stalk. There are often four to eight snowy white flowers per cluster each with six tepals, three nearly identical petals and sepals with a narrow pointed shape that spreads outward to resemble a star. The flowers are of a translucent or crystalline character rather than waxy and the thin tepals glisten in sunlight. Each measures 2 to 2.5 cm (0.8 to 1 in) long, but just 3–7 millimeters wide.

The base of the tepals fuse into a long tube attaching to the underground parts. The floral tube can be 4 to 10 cm (1.6 to 3.9 in) long, but typically is 5 to 8 cm (2.0 to 3.1 in) in length. The six thread-like stamens attach near the top of the tube with an exposed portion shorter than the tepals. Each stamen is topped with bright yellow pollen. The species is dimorphic in its pollen production, with two distinct pollen forms occurring in separate populations. Flowers are accompanied by an intense, sweet fragrance. Blooming may be as early as March or as late as June. Warmth in the month of March causes blooming to begin earlier and precipitation in May and June increases the duration of blooming.

The fruit is a three sided capsule, but it is also found underground so it is seldom seen. It will measure about 5–8 mm. Each capsule contains a few to several black, angled seeds of about 3 to 4 mm in size. According to William Weber and Ronald C. Wittmann the stalk attaching the capsule extends as it becomes mature so that the seeds will be found just under the soil surface and then are pushed up by the next year's emerging flowers. However, J.G. Lemmon reported in 1877 that when the leaves dry out and blow away their in-curved bases will carry away the seed capsules. In the 2006 book Dakota Flora the botanist Dave Ode suggested that ants or other insects dig up and distribute the seeds.

== Taxonomy ==
Leucocrinum montanum, and the genus of which it is the sole species, was scientifically described by Asa Gray in 1837 with him crediting Thomas Nuttall for the description. Into the 2010s it was usually placed in the family Liliaceae. However, in the APG III system, published in 2009, placed the genus into Asparagaceae in the Agavoideae subfamily. This classification continued in APG IV. Though, alternatively, it is sometimes placed in a family named Anthericaceae. It is most closely related to the plants in genus Echeandia, the craglilies.

=== Synonyms ===
The genus has one synonym, Leucrinis which was named by Constantine Samuel Rafinesque in 1838. The species has two heterotypic synonyms, both botanical varieties.

Table of Synonyms
Name	Year
Leucocrinum montanum var. fibrosum E.H.Kelso	1933
Leucocrinum montanum var. majus Baker	1879

=== Names ===
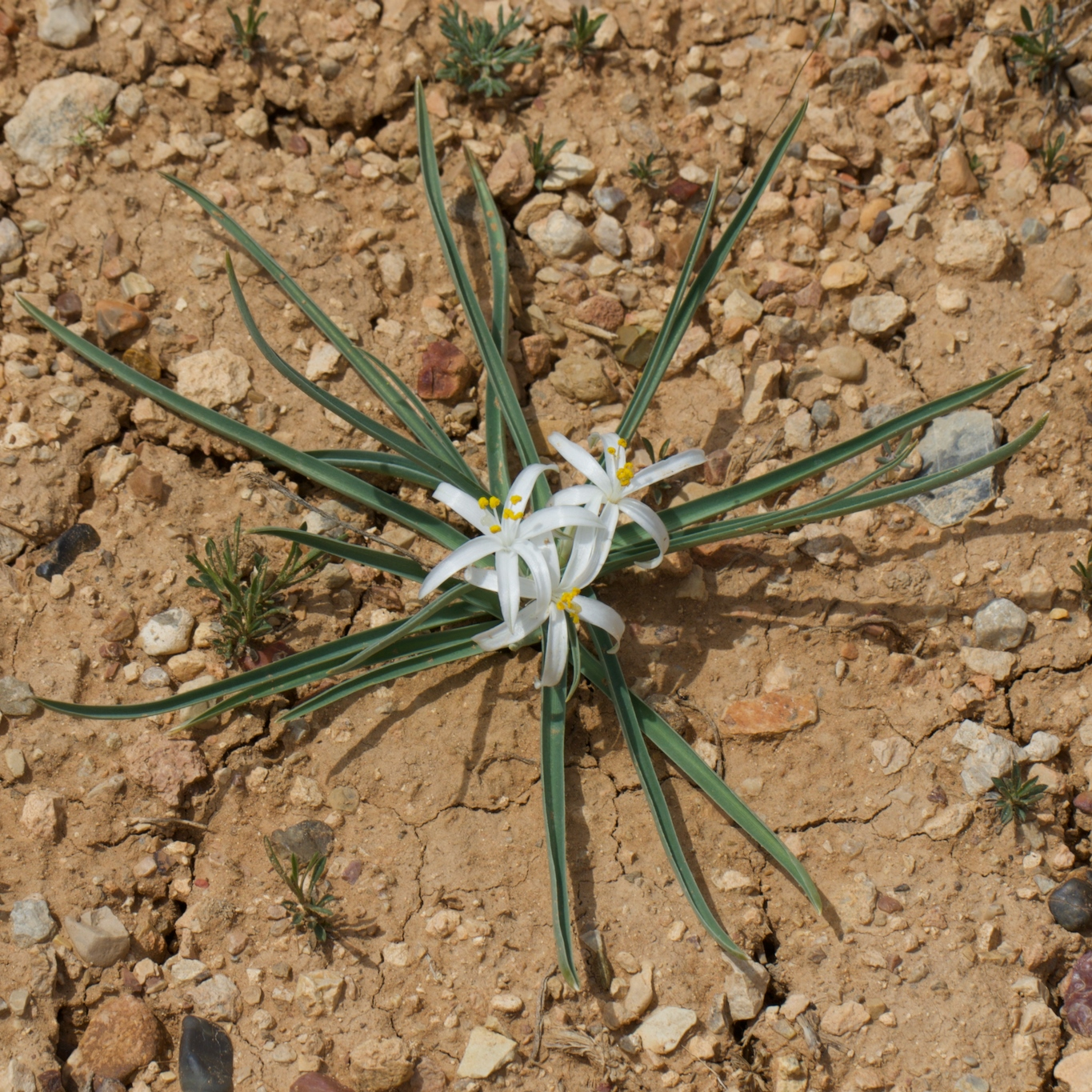
Blooming in White Pine County, Nevada

Leucocrinum (Lew-koh-krye-num) is a New Latin construction derived from Greek meaning "white lily". The species name, montanum, means "of the mountains". It is frequently known by the common names common starlily, starlily, star-lily, or star lily, however many other plants are casually called star lily including Lilium concolor, Milla biflora, and Toxicoscordion fremontii. It is also very commonly called sandlily, sand-lily, or sand lily, however other species are occasionally known by all three spelling variants including Oenothera cespitosa, Mentzelia decapetala, Colchicum ritchii, and Pancratium maritimum. It is also sometimes known by many other lily related names such as mountain-lily, white mountain lily, mountain star-lily, desert-lily, and sage lily. It was also occasionally called wild tuberose.

In the 1890s in Colorado it was called white crocus, despite not being related to those flowers. Also in Colorado, Alice Eastwood recorded the name white prairie lily in 1893.

It is called see-goo-ah-gump in the Northern Paiute language. In the Lakȟóta language it is called yapízapi hú iyéčheča with the meaning "it is like feathery false lily of the valley", which is called yapízapi hú.

== Range and habitat ==
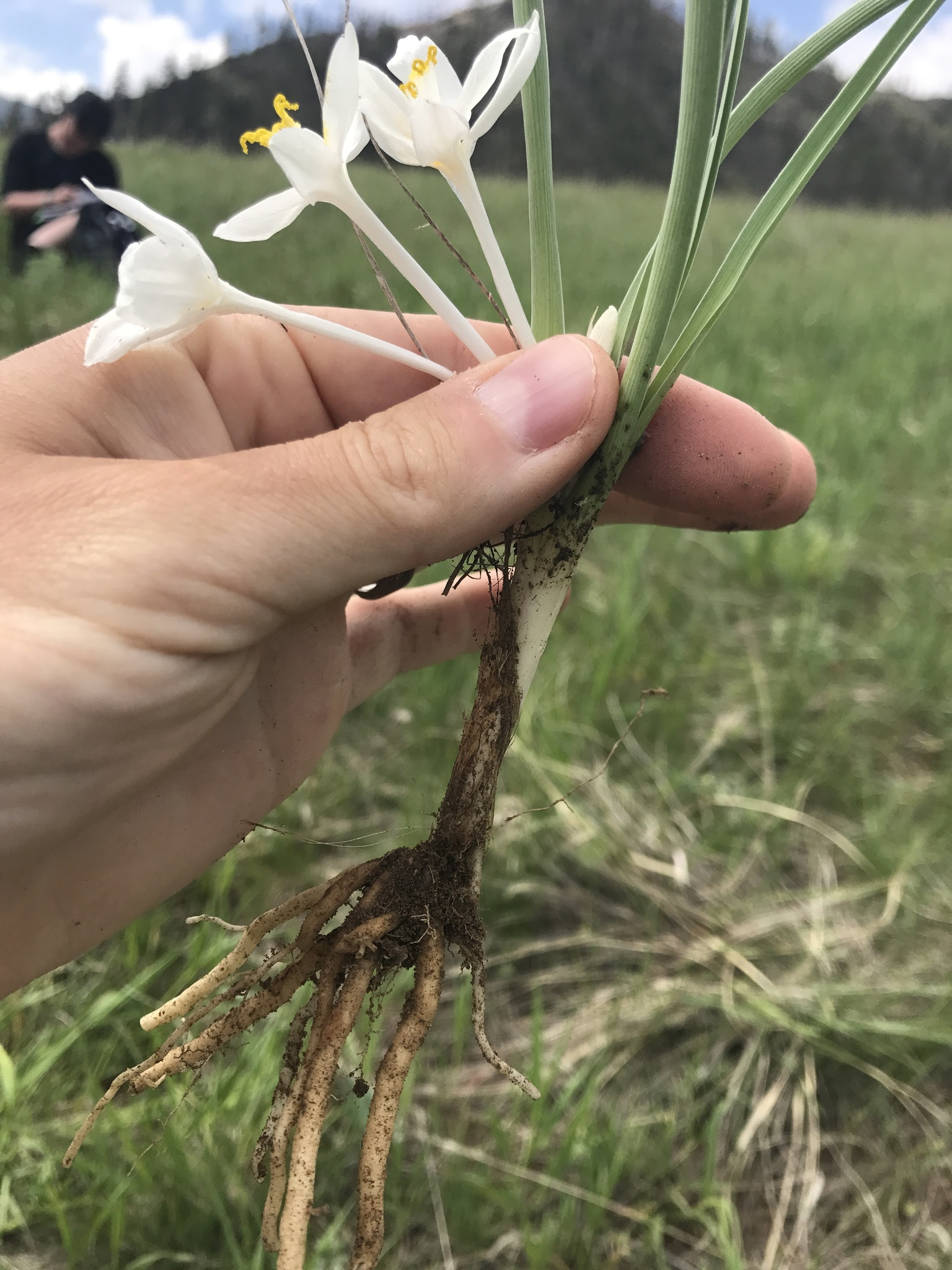
An uprooted plant showing the relatively large, fleshy roots. Roosevelt National Forest, Larimer County, Colorado.

Starlily grows across much of the western United States with a range that estimated at between 200,000–2,500,000 square kilometers (77,000–965,000 sq mi). The eastern part of its range stretches from North Dakota to New Mexico in the shortgrass prairie. In North Dakota it is only recorded in two southwestern counties by the USDA Natural Resources Conservation Service PLANTS database (PLANTS), but grows through much of the southern two-thirds of Montana and even as far north as Flathead County. In Wyoming it mostly grows in the eastern half of the state, but also grows in Park County in the northwest. In South Dakota it grows only in the westernmost portion of the state as is the case in neighboring Nebraska. In Colorado it grows in the majority of the eastern plains, but also in some of the mountain and western counties. In New Mexico they are only found in a few areas in the northern part of the state.

The western part of the starlily's range crosses the Rocky Mountains and extends across much of the Great Basin and into the surrounding Intermountain West. In Arizona according to PLANTS it is only found in Mohave County. It is also limited to just four counties in southern Utah and the same number in southwestern Idaho. However, it grows in almost all of Nevada and large parts of Oregon east of the Cascades as well as Josephine County. In California they grow in the Klamath Basin east to the Modoc Plateau in the northeast part of the state.

The common starlily grows at elevations of 800 meters (2,600 ft) up to 2,400 m (7,900 ft).

=== Conservation ===
The conservation organization NatureServe evaluated Leucocrinum montanum in 2024 and rated it as secure globally (G5). They also rate it as apparently secure (S4) in the states of Montana and Wyoming. However, it is vulnerable (S3) in Nevada and imperiled (S2) in Utah and North Dakota. They rated it as critically imperiled (S1) in Arizona, but have not evaluated other states in its range. There are over 1,800 occurrences that are threatened by human activities, but due to the broad habitat preferences of the species and large number of safe populations it is overall considered secure.

== Ecology ==
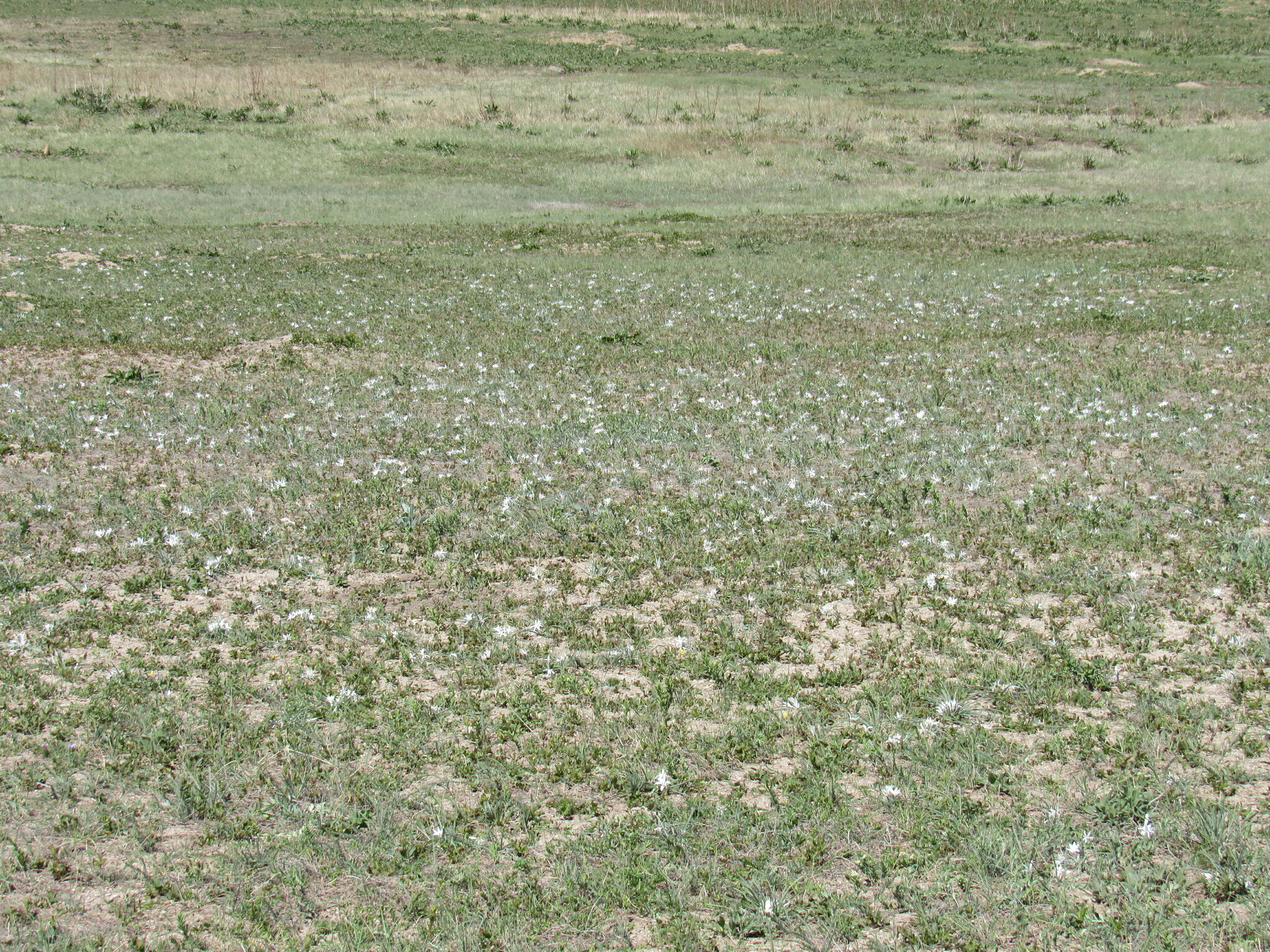
Large population of Leucocrinum montanum blooming on BLM land, Larimer County, Colorado

Common starlily is a minor food source, less than 1% in one study, for the eastern deer mouse on the prairies of Colorado. The North American little black ant visits the flowers to collect pollen and the flowers are also visted by honey bees. The blister beetle Epicauta parvula has been observed eating the flower petals and leaves and the grasshopper Spharagemon equale eats the leaves as well. As a caterpillar, the generalist white-lined sphinx moth (Hyles lineata) sometimes eats the leaves. Though it is not a major component of grasslands, grazing cattle show a moderate preference for its leaves. Like cool-season grasses and sedges it is found in higher numbers on rangelands that are grazed at low intensities rather than at high intensities. In contrast, in an experiment with captive pronghorns they only consumed trace amounts of starlily when available.

The disease causing rust species Puccinia sporoboli infects starlilies.

== Uses ==
=== Traditional uses ===
One of the Northern Paiute people interviewed at the Duck Valley Indian Reservation in about 1940 reported using the roots ground to a soapy texture to heal sores or swellings. In 1890 the botanist J.W. Blankinship recorded that the Crow people of Montana would eat the roots.

=== Cultivation ===
The wildflower writer Claude A. Barr reports that, though starlilies do require a well drained soil, they do not need an entirely sandy soil as their name suggests. He recorded them performing best in firm clay, sandy clay loam, or gravelly clay that is low in organic matter. Other writers report good results growing plants in well drained sandy or gravelly loam that is warm and only slightly rich in full sun, though requiring dry conditions. The critical period for the plants is from their dormancy in the late spring until they begin growing in the late winter, with excessive rain during the summer or fall being detrimental to plants. They cannot compete with other taller garden plants. Their leaves disappear soon after their flowers and so annuals or plants that leaf out later are planted with them. Fall is the least damaging time for moving dormant plants. A starlily that has been moved or divided will usually not bloom in the next year or perhaps even the year after. The Colorado State University Extension service rates this as one of the least flammable native plants, suitable for landscaping around homes and structures in wildland–urban interface areas.

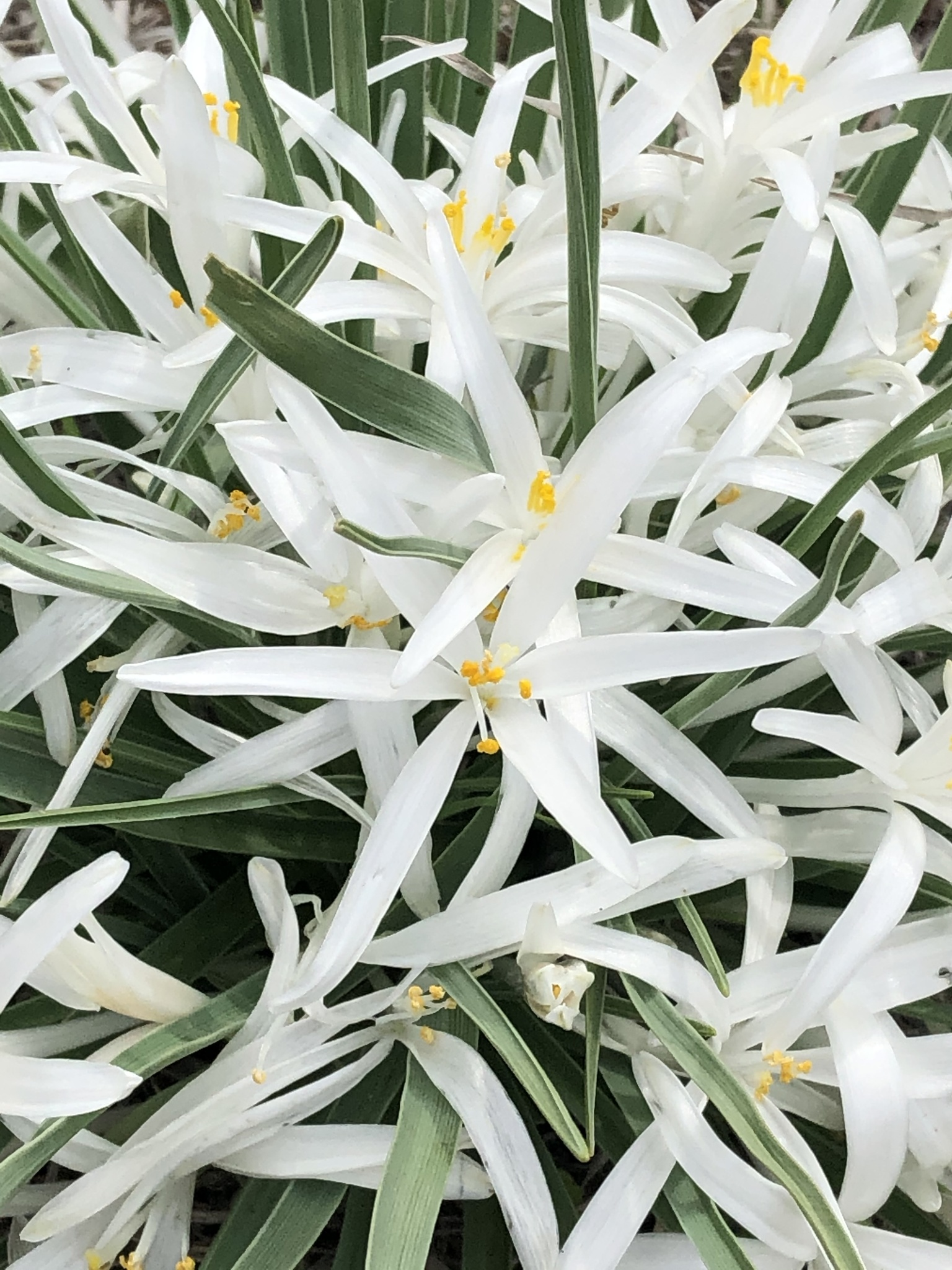
Plant with large number of blooms, Boulder Open Space and Trails, Boulder County, Colorado

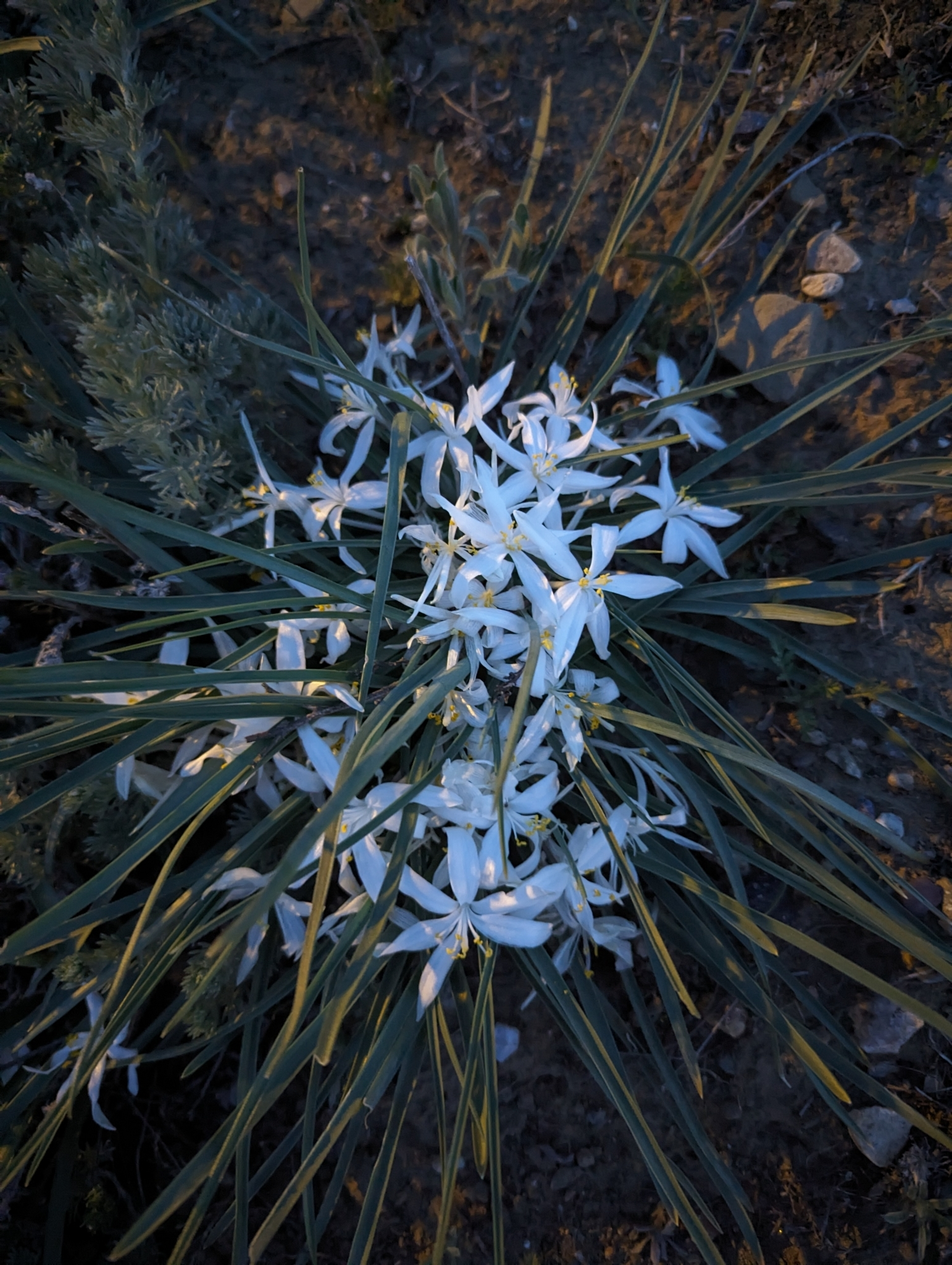
Flowers at dusk in Yellowstone County, Montana

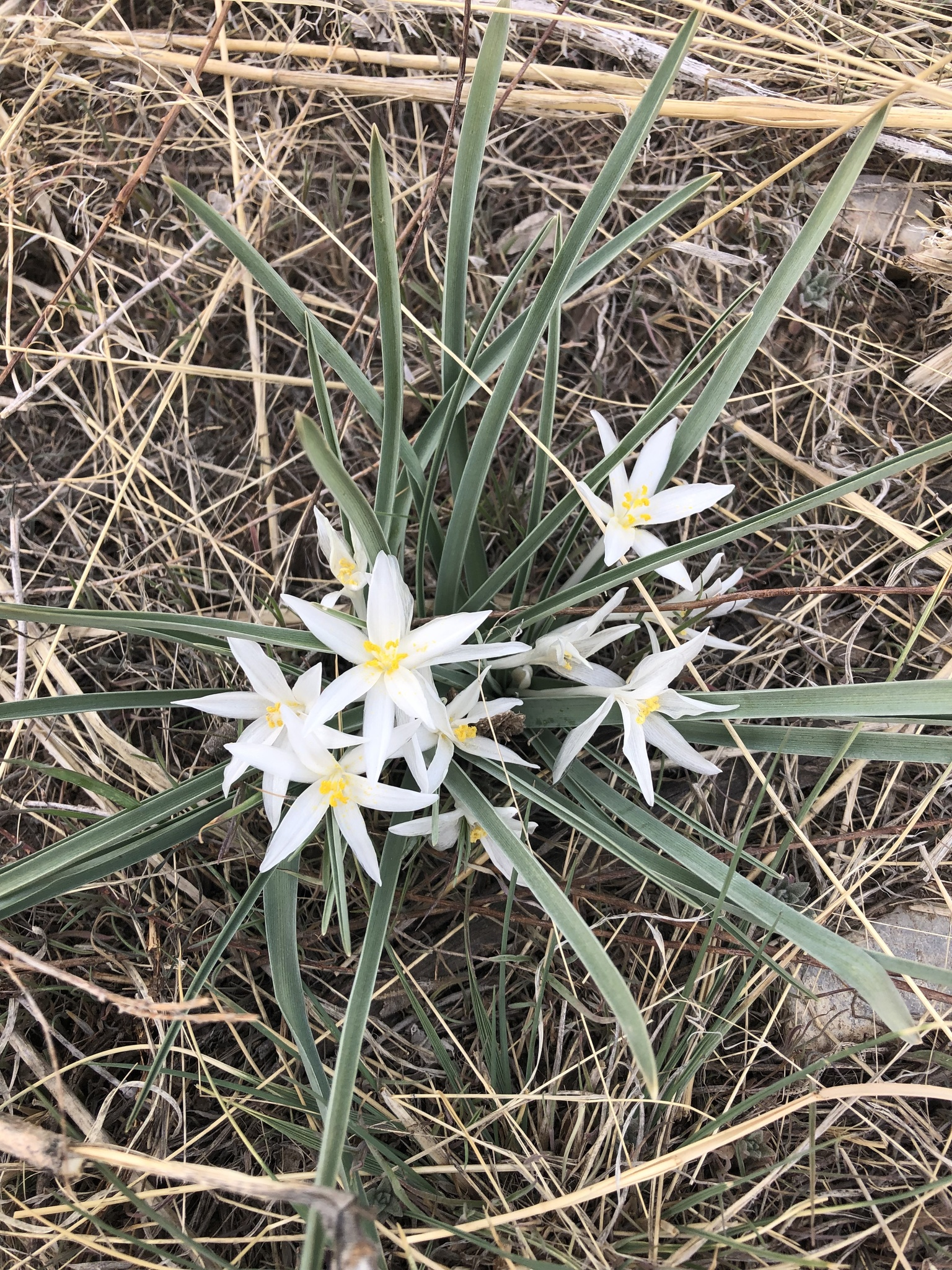
Plant with white edges on its leaves, on BLM land in Larimer County, Colorado

== See also ==
- List of plants known as lily
