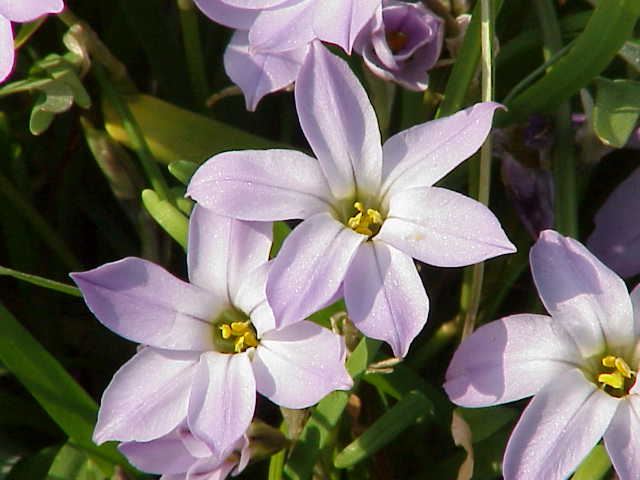

Scientific classification
- Kingdom: Plantae
- Clade: Tracheophytes
- Clade: Angiosperms
- Clade: Monocots
- Order: Asparagales
- Family: Amaryllidaceae
- Subfamily: Allioideae
- Genus: Ipheion
- Species: I. uniflorum

Binomial name
- Ipheion uniflorum (Raf.) Traub

Synonyms
- Triteleia uniflora Lindl.; Brodiaea uniflora (Lindl.) Engl.; Tristagma uniflorum (Lindl.) Traub; Milla uniflora (Lindl.) Graham

= Ipheion uniflorum =

Species of flowering plant

Ipheion uniflorum is a species of flowering plant, related to the onions, placed in the allium subfamily (Allioideae) of the Amaryllidaceae. It is known by the common name springstar, or spring starflower. Along with all species of the genus Ipheion, some sources place it in the genus Tristagma, but research published in 2010 suggested that this is incorrect. It is native to Argentina and Uruguay, but is widely cultivated as an ornamental and reportedly naturalized in Great Britain, France, Australia, New Zealand and the United States.

== Description ==
This is a small herbaceous perennial growing from a bulb and producing flat, shiny, green, hairless, grasslike leaves up to 30 cm (12 in) long. The foliage has an onion-like scent when crushed. The stem grows up to 20 cm (8 in) tall and bears a solitary showy flower in spring (hence the Latin name uniflorum - "single flower"). Each honey-scented, star-shaped flower has six pointed lobes, up to 3 centimeters long, in shades ranging from very pale to deep purple-blue.

== Cultivation ==
Ipheion uniflorum has been grown in the UK since 1820, when bulbs collected near Buenos Aires arrived in the country. It is recommended for growing in a well-drained position outside or as a long-flowering pot plant in an unheated greenhouse. Various named forms are in cultivation, some of which may be hybrids. 'Wisley Blue' is a clear lilac blue; 'Froyle Mill' is a deeper violet blue; 'Album' is white. The cultivar 'Alberto Castillo', also white, has larger flowers and was collected in the 1980s by Alberto Castillo, the owner of Ezeiza Botanical Garden, from an abandoned garden in Buenos Aires. In the United States, the species is stated to be hardy to USDA Zone 5 and is recommended for massing in borders, alpine gardens and other areas, or for naturalizing in lawns.

The following cultivars have gained the Royal Horticultural Society's Award of Garden Merit:-

- ’Alberto Castillo’
- 'Froyle Mill'
- 'Rolf Fiedler'
- 'Wisley Blue'

== Media ==
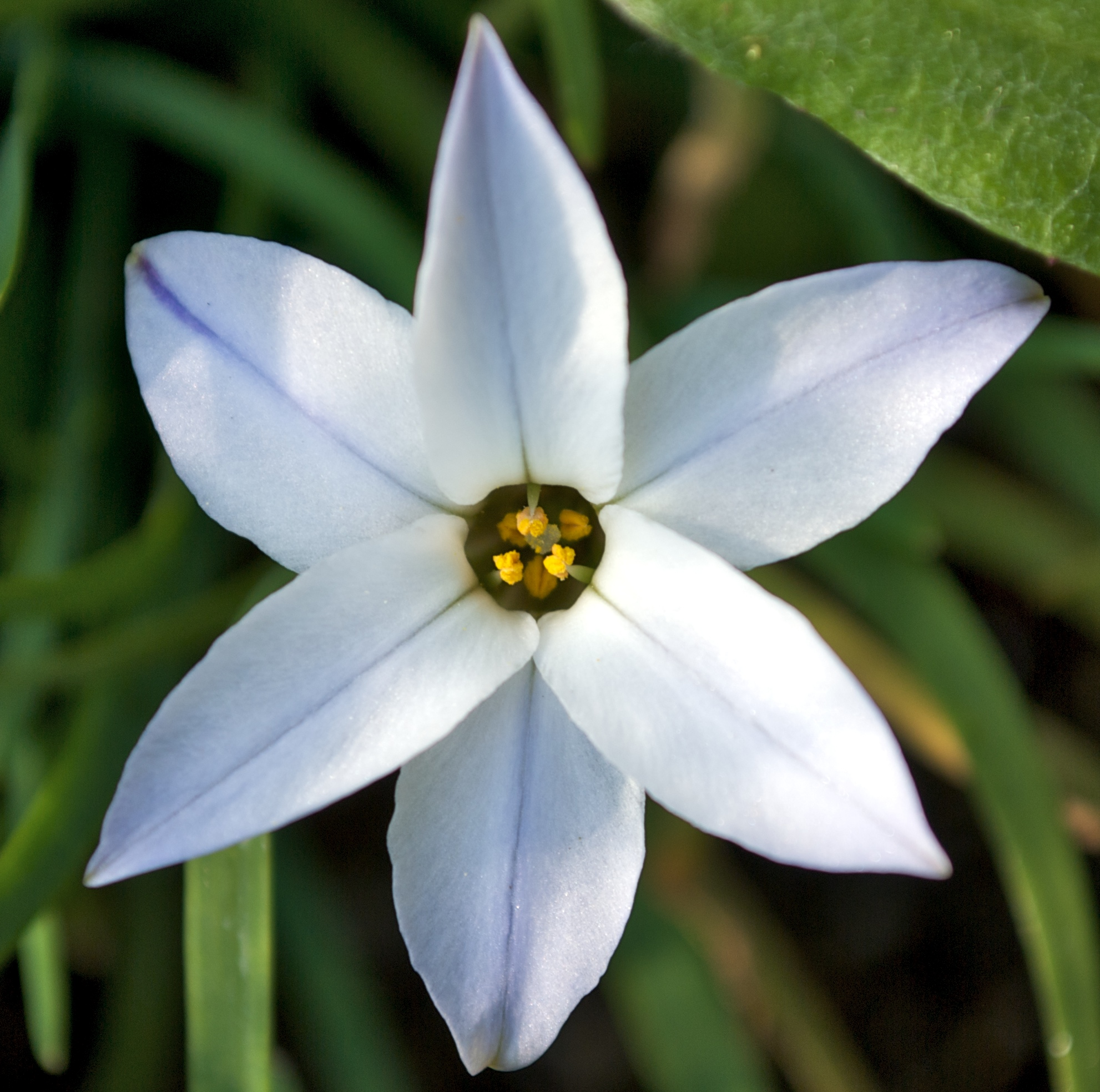

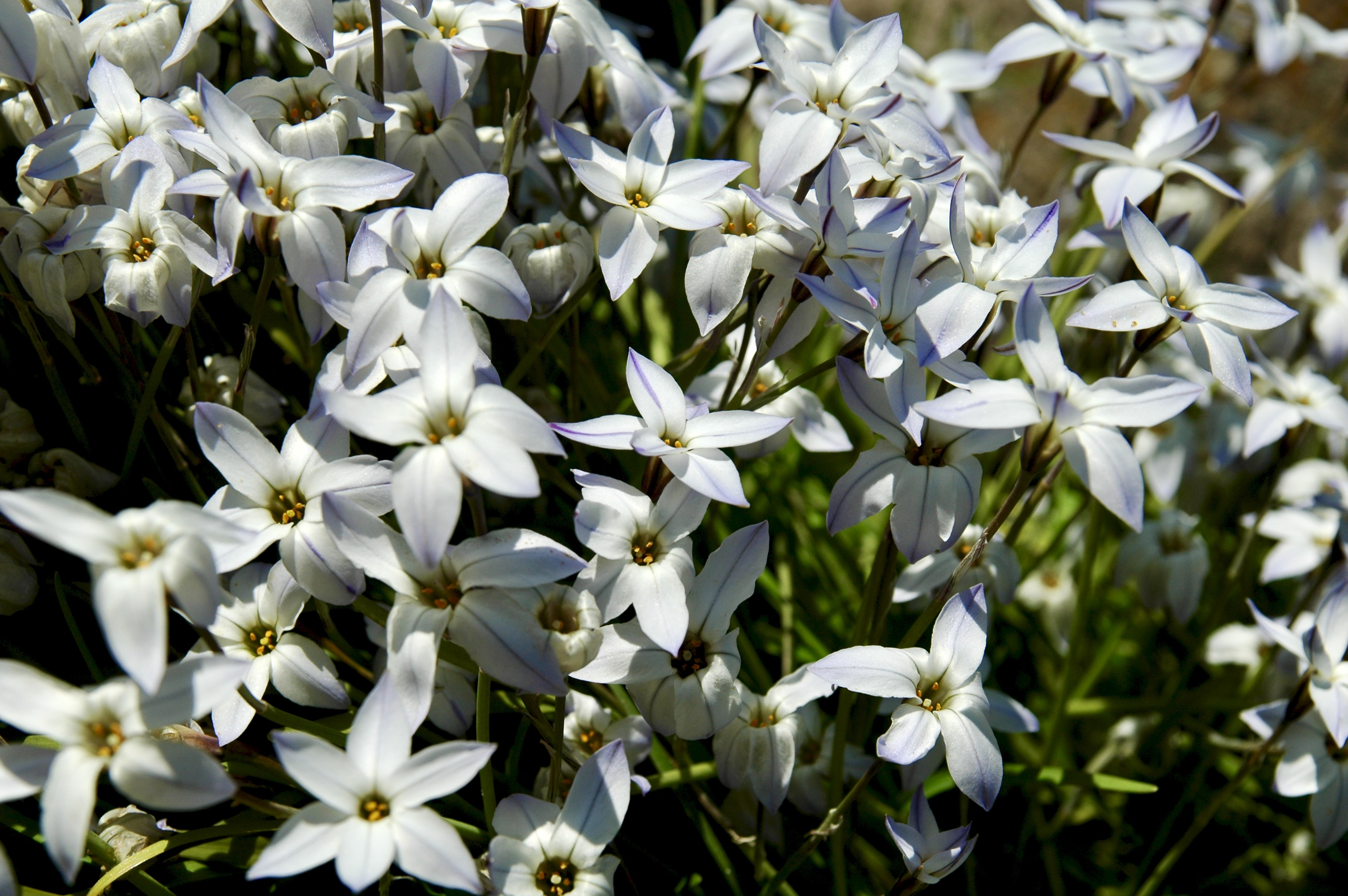

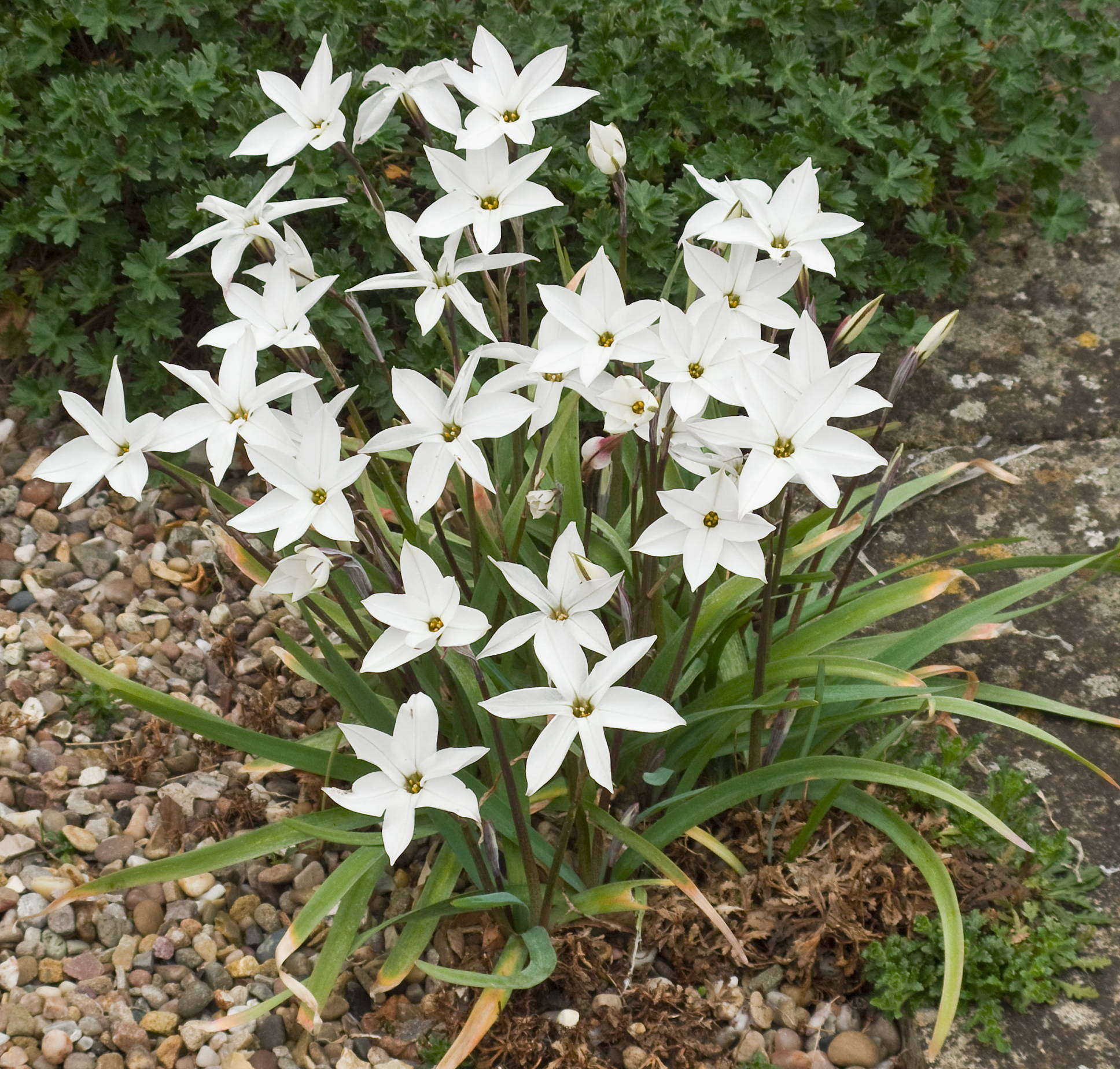
'Alberto Castillo'

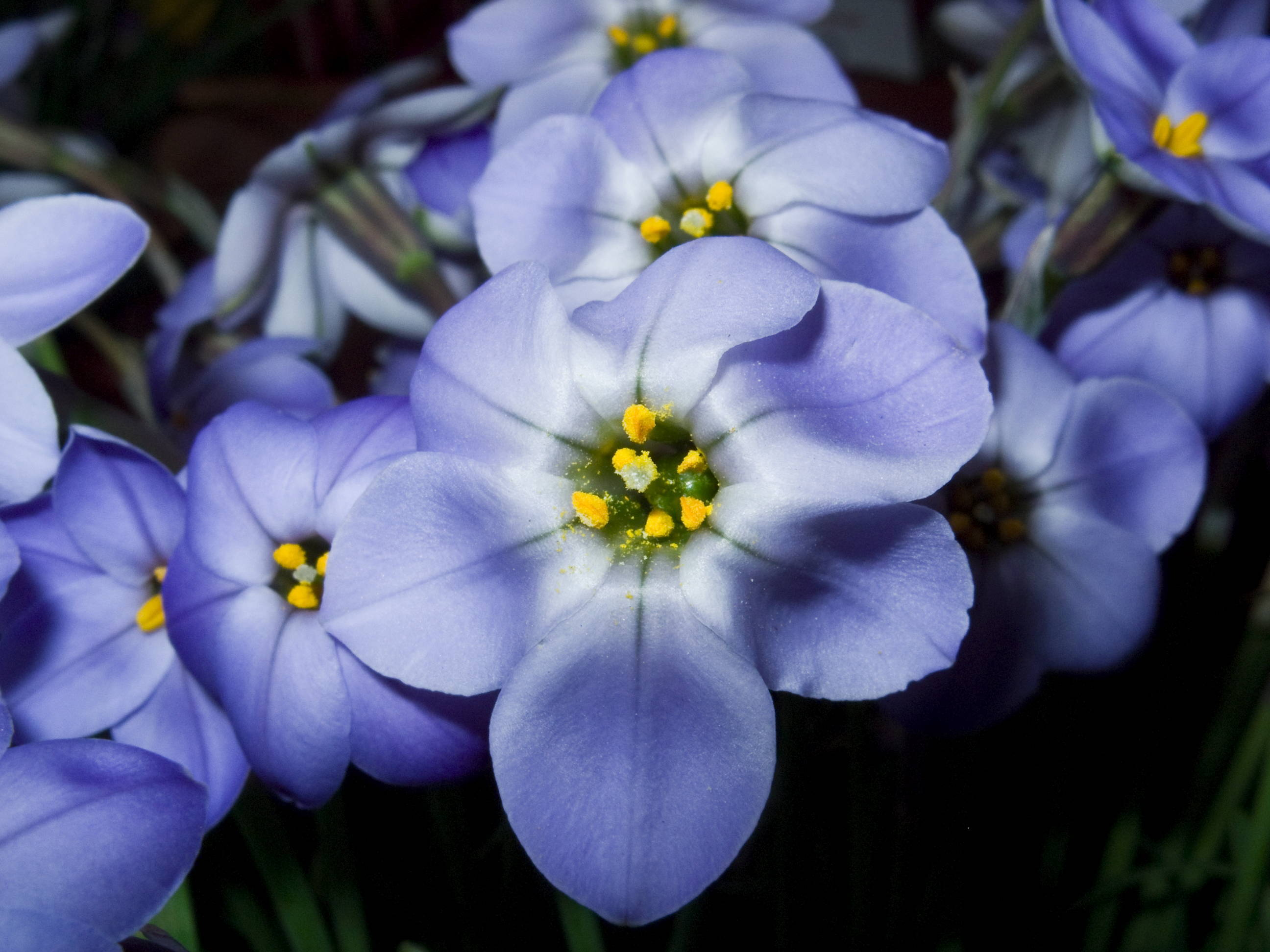
Closeup of 'Rolf Fiedler'
