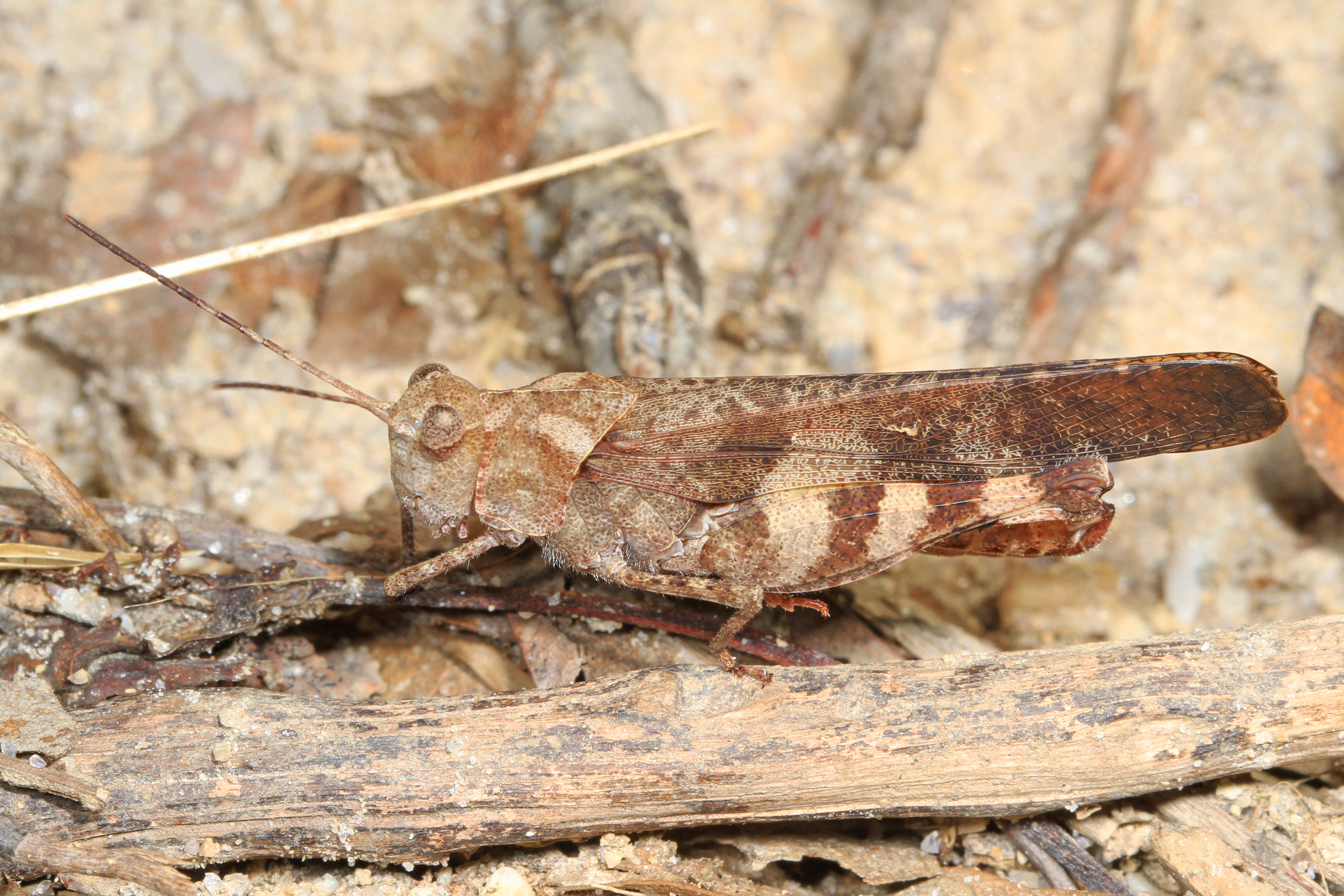
- Spharagemon bolli

Scientific classification
- Kingdom: Animalia
- Phylum: Arthropoda
- Clade: Pancrustacea
- Class: Insecta
- Order: Orthoptera
- Suborder: Caelifera
- Family: Acrididae
- Subfamily: Oedipodinae
- Tribe: Trimerotropini
- Genus: Spharagemon; Scudder, 1875

Synonyms
- Eximacris Otte, 1984; Scirtetica Saussure, 1884; Scirtettica Beutenmüller, 1894

= Spharagemon =

Genus of grasshoppers

Spharagemon is a genus of band-winged grasshoppers in the family Acrididae. There are about 9 described species in Spharagemon.

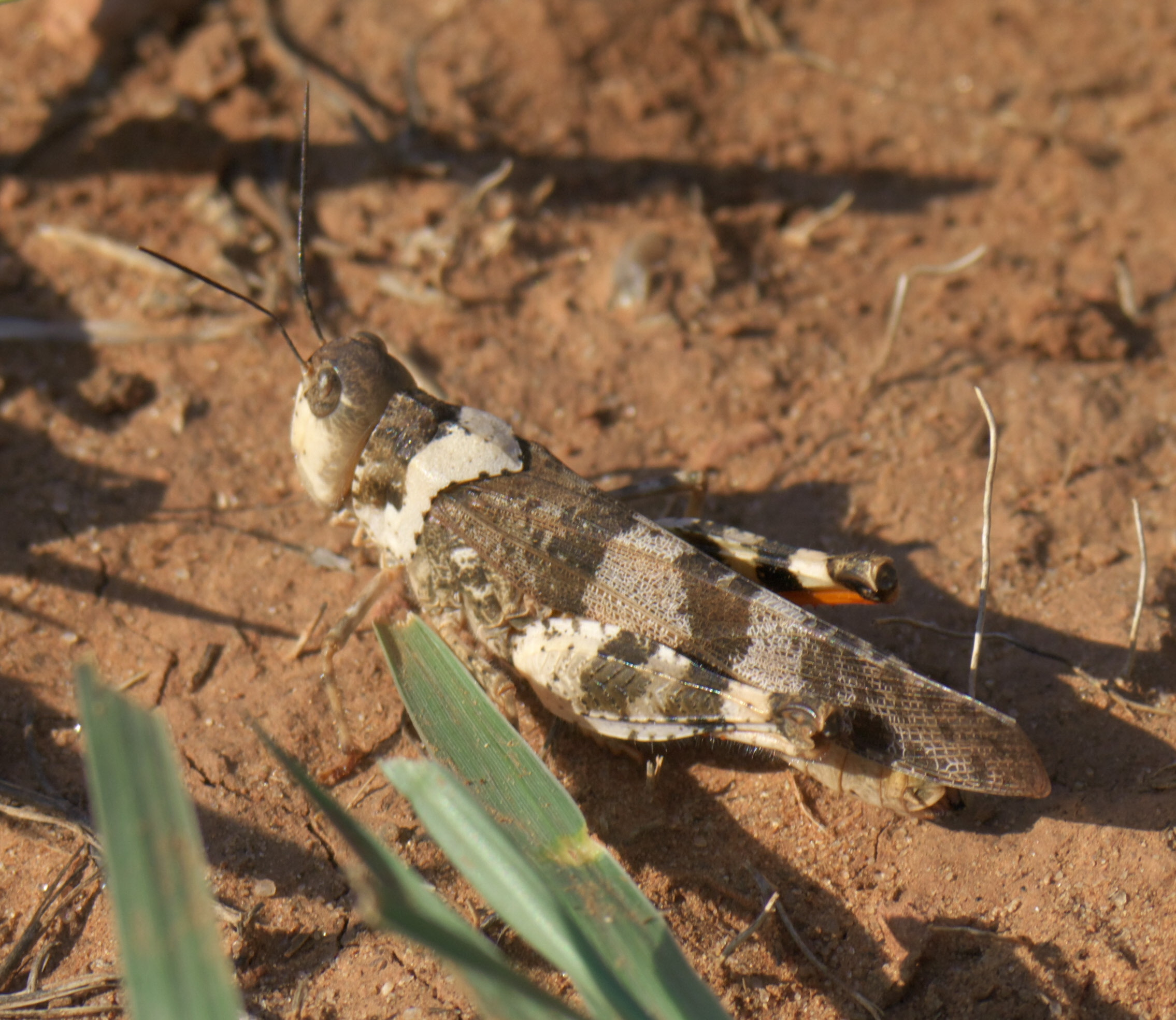
Spharagemon equale

== Species ==
- Spharagemon bolli Scudder, 1875 (Boll's grasshopper)
- Spharagemon bunites Otte, 1984
- Spharagemon campestris (McNeill, 1901) (campestral grasshopper)
- Spharagemon collare (Scudder, 1872) (mottled sand grasshopper)
- Spharagemon crepitans (Saussure, 1884) (crepitating grasshopper)
- Spharagemon cristatum Scudder, 1875 (ridgeback grasshopper)
- Spharagemon equale (Say, 1825) (Say's grasshopper)
- Spharagemon marmorata (Harris, 1841)
- Spharagemon saxatile Morse, 1894 (ledge grasshopper)
