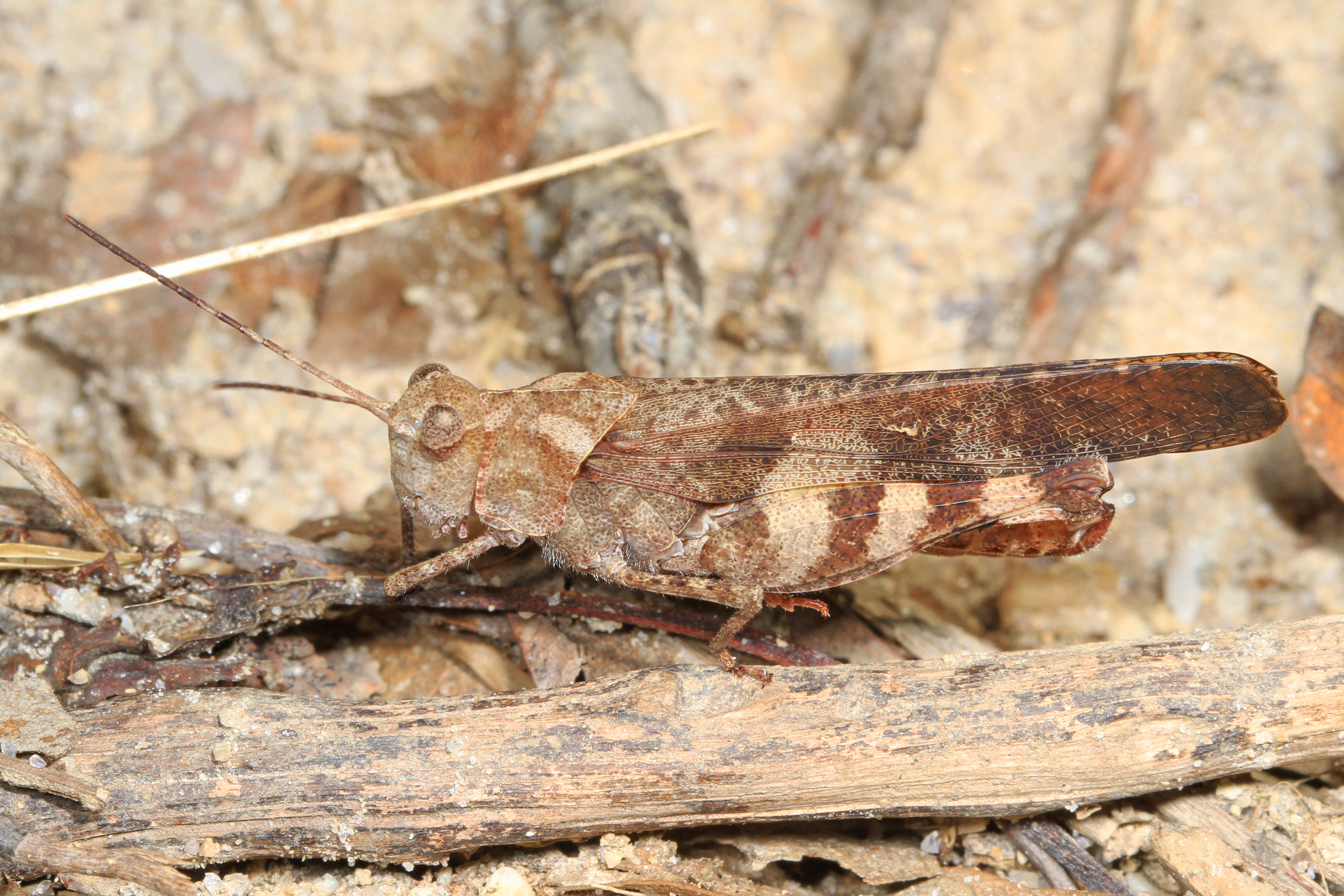

Scientific classification
- Kingdom: Animalia
- Phylum: Arthropoda
- Clade: Pancrustacea
- Class: Insecta
- Order: Orthoptera
- Suborder: Caelifera
- Family: Acrididae
- Tribe: Trimerotropini
- Genus: Spharagemon
- Species: S. bolli

Binomial name
- Spharagemon bolli Scudder, 1875

= Spharagemon bolli =

Species of grasshopper

Spharagemon bolli, known generally as the Boll's grasshopper or Boll's locust, is a species of band-winged grasshopper in the family Acrididae. It is found in North America.

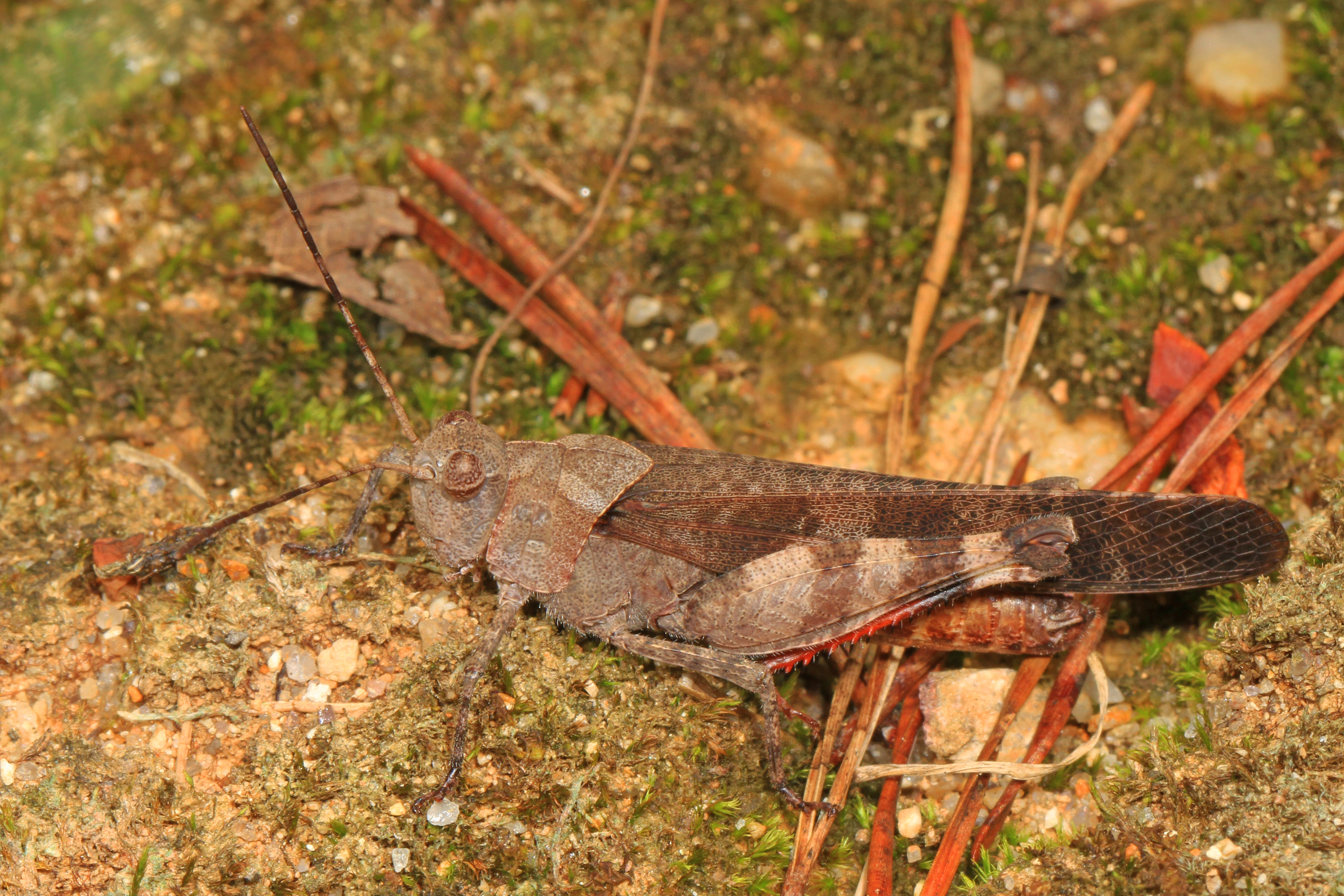
Boll's grasshopper, Spharagemon bolli

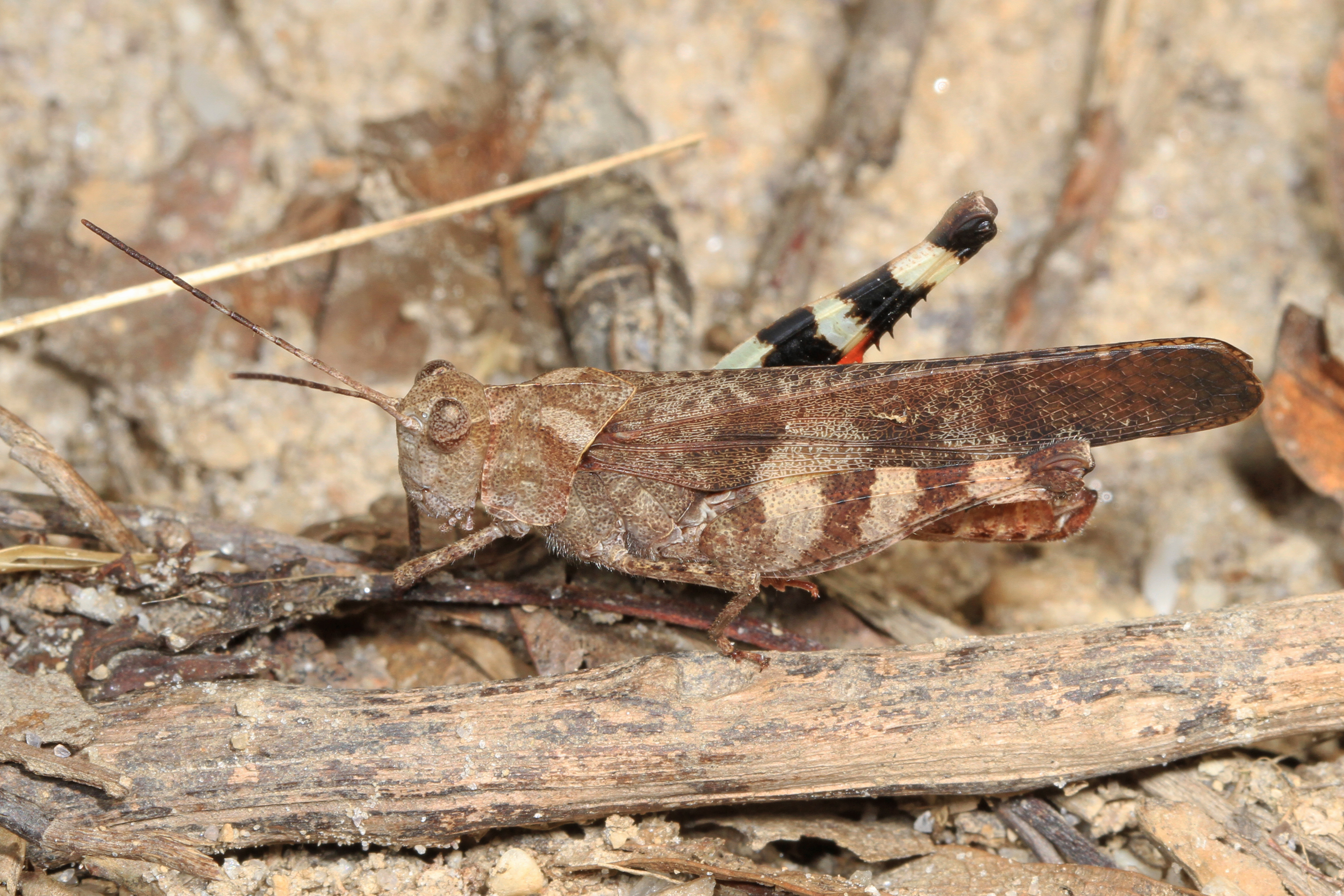
Boll's grasshopper, Spharagemon bolli
