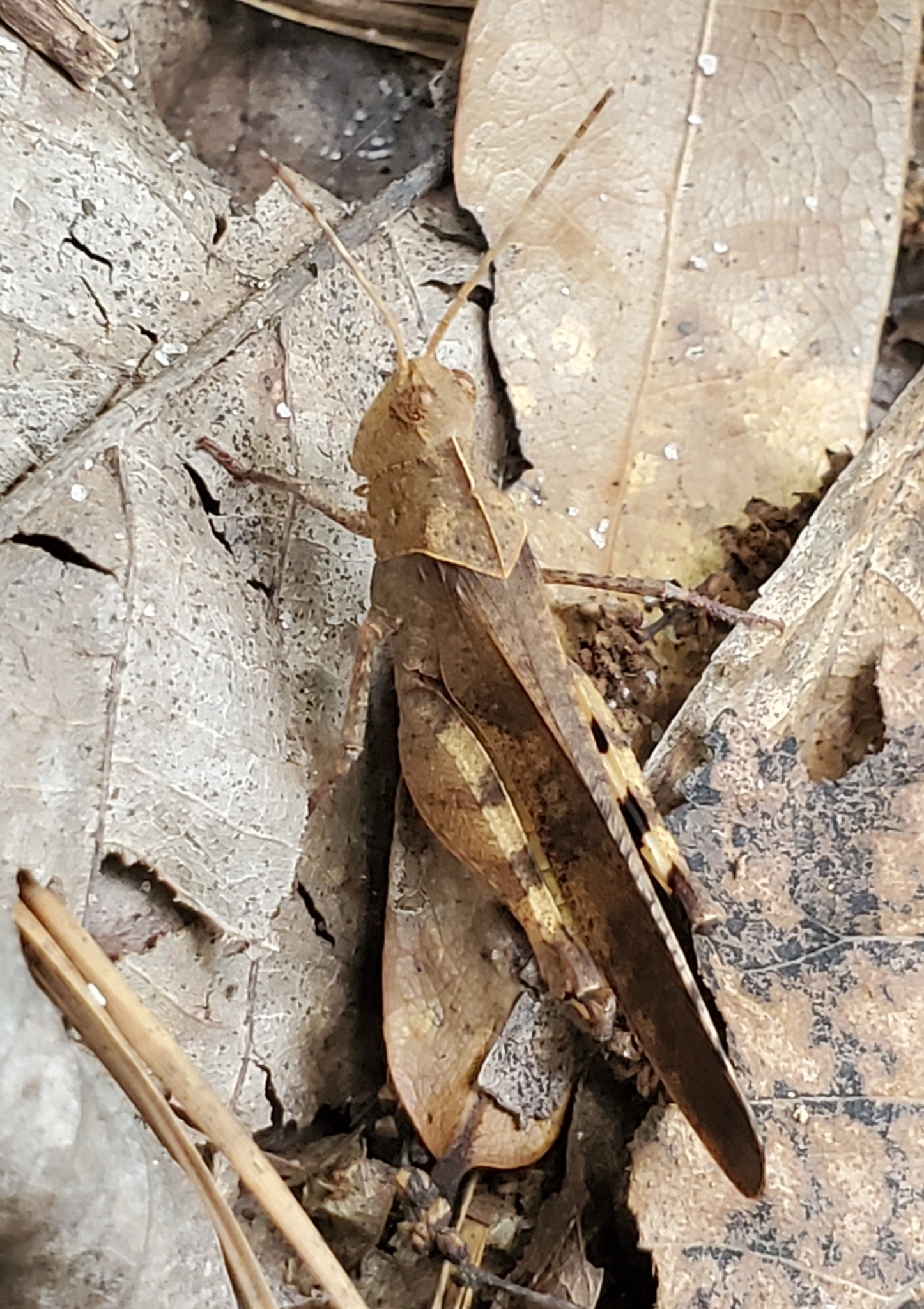

Scientific classification
- Kingdom: Animalia
- Phylum: Arthropoda
- Clade: Pancrustacea
- Class: Insecta
- Order: Orthoptera
- Suborder: Caelifera
- Family: Acrididae
- Genus: Spharagemon
- Species: S. crepitans

Binomial name
- Spharagemon crepitans (Saussure, 1884)

= Spharagemon crepitans =

Species of grasshopper

Spharagemon crepitans, commonly known as the crepitating grasshopper, is a species of band-winged grasshopper in the family Acrididae. It is found in North America.
