= Spharagemon campestris =

Scientific classification
- Kingdom: Animalia
- Phylum: Arthropoda
- Clade: Pancrustacea
- Class: Insecta
- Order: Orthoptera
- Suborder: Caelifera
- Family: Acrididae
- Tribe: Trimerotropini
- Genus: Spharagemon
- Species: S. campestris

Binomial name
- Spharagemon campestris (McNeill, 1901)

Species of grasshopper

Spharagemon campestris, the campestral grasshopper, is a species of band-winged grasshopper in the family Acrididae. It is found in North America.
