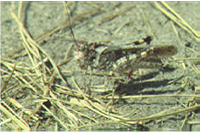

Scientific classification
- Kingdom: Animalia
- Phylum: Arthropoda
- Clade: Pancrustacea
- Class: Insecta
- Order: Orthoptera
- Suborder: Caelifera
- Family: Acrididae
- Genus: Spharagemon
- Species: S. collare

Binomial name
- Spharagemon collare (Scudder, 1872)

= Spharagemon collare =

Species of grasshopper

Spharagemon collare, the mottled sand grasshopper, is found in sandy-soiled, grassy areas of northern United States and southern Canada. They are known to be a minor pest of wheat crops; however, populations are rarely large enough to cause appreciable damage.

== Description ==
=== Adult ===
Adult mottled sand grasshoppers are light to dark tan with dark brown to black speckles that sometimes appear as bands or stripes. The mottled sand grasshopper relies heavily on its camouflaging colors for protection against predators. Most notably, the rear tibia is orange or red, and the inside of the femur is yellow with four darker bands. The wings extend past the end of the abdomen. The forewing is speckled or banded and varies in color, and the hindwing has wide bands of light yellow and black with a clear wing tip. The mottled sand grasshopper has an enlarged pronotal ridge behind the head that looks like a collar. This species exhibits sexual dimorphism—females are larger than males, with a total body length of 27 to 37 mm. The males have an average body length (to end of forewings) of 23 to 31 mm. The mottled sand grasshopper has five nymphal stages. In each stage there are changes in size, coloring, and wing development. The adult grasshoppers are present from July to September. The progression through the five nymphal stages takes a minimum of 42 days, and males spend less time in each stage than the females. The five instars will exist at the same time due to the long hatching period.

=== Description of five instars ===
BL = body length, FL = femur length, AS = number of antennal segments.

Instar	I	II	III	IV	V (male)	V (female)
BL (mm)	4.5-5.8	5.8-8.2	8.2-11	11-14.7	15.2-15.5	17.5-21
FL (mm)	2.6-3	3.6-4.1	5.3-6.2	6.6-7.8	9-9.7	11-12
AS	10-11	14-15	17-19	20-22	22-23	23

== Distribution ==
The mottled sand grasshopper is found in northern and western United States and southern Canada. Their optimal habitat is in loose, sandy soil. They are especially common along edges of wheat fields. They are most commonly seen in Kansas, Oklahoma, Texas, New Mexico, Colorado, and Michigan.

== Population density ==
=== Current data ===
The mottled sand grasshopper is rarely found in high densities. Usual levels are .1 to 1 per square yard. However, they have been recorded to reach 10 per square yard in Idaho.

=== Historical data ===
In the 1800s, population levels oscillated between 0.01 and 0.2 adults per square yard in the Nebraska Sand Hills. It was shown that this was mostly due to predation by birds such as the grasshopper sparrow and the meadow lark. In Wyoming, up to five adult grasshoppers were found per square yard in 1992.

== Behavior ==
=== Diet and eating habits ===
The mottled sand grasshopper is herbivorous, eating 19 to 28 different species of plants consisting of grasses, sedges, and forbs. "Blue grama, needle-and-thread grass, western wheatgrass, sand dropseed, witchgrass, and threadleaf" are the main grasses and sedges eaten by the mottled sand grasshopper. Other, less favored grasses and sedges include "sand bluestem, little bluestem, prairie sandreed, buffalograss, hairy grama, junegrass, sun sedge and baltic rush". Forbs eaten include "kochia, Missouri milkvetch, sand sagebrush, western sticktight, sunflower, redroot pigweed, bracted spiderwort, rusty lupine, western ragweed". They are geophilous, meaning they live and forage on the ground. They may climb up stalks of grass to cut off a piece to eat, but they mostly forage on ground debris. The front tarsi are used to hold the grass while the grasshopper lies horizontally.

=== Flight ===
The female mottled sand grasshopper has been seen to fly 9 to 10 feet at a time, whereas the males fly slightly shorter distances (only 3 to 8 feet per flight), possibly due to their smaller size and smaller wings. They are observed to fly in straight lines, only making right turns at the beginning or end of their flight. Males will usually only crepitate (make noise by snapping their wings together) when flying away from danger. Males have been observed to also crepitate when moving towards females.

=== Reproduction ===
Male mottled sand grasshoppers will remain in one place for an extended time until they spot another moving grasshopper. The males seek out other males and females of their own species, and if the individual is identified as female, the males will make two stridulations with their legs and begin courting the female. A female will often reject a male’s courting because she wants to mate with only the strongest, genetically superior male. The female will reject a mate by shaking their femora and using their rear tarsi to hit the ground. The mottled sand grasshopper will generally mate in May, and the nymphs emerge at the end of May and beginning of June. After mating, the female oviposits her pod, which contains about 21 to 28 eggs, into the sand about a half inch deep and then covers them over with sand. The pods are ¾ inches long with a diameter of 3/16 inches, and each egg is 5 to 5.2 mm long and is tan in color. This ovipositing has been observed to last about 34 minutes. The nymphs and adults live their lives in the same area in which they were born.

=== Daily activity ===
The mottled grasshopper will rest overnight on the ground in a protected area or clinging to a stalk of grass. In the dawn hours, they are observed to bask in the sun, exposing their abdomen to the sun rays and extending their hindleg on the side of the sun. They will rotate to expose the other side to the sun. Once the ground and their bodies heat up the grasshoppers will begin foraging for food. They will take a break during the peak heat hours of the day and will rest in the shade. Then they will continue looking for food and mates until dusk, when they again bask in the sunlight. Then, they seek out a protected place to stay for the night and they will rest horizontally and are not easily flushed from their spots.

== Similar species ==
Spharagemon cristantum is the closest taxonomic relative of S. collare. Ways to differentiate between the two include (a) examining length of forewing (S. cristantum length is greater than 29 mm in males) (b) pronotum of S. cristantum is more pointed and pronotal crest is higher than S. collare and (c) S. cristantum males will stridulate more often than S. collare males. Also, S. cristantum is found in more southern areas of the United States than S. collare. Other species of the genus Spharagemon include: S. equale, S. campestris, S. bunites, S. cripitans, S. bolli, S. saxatile, and S. marmorata.
