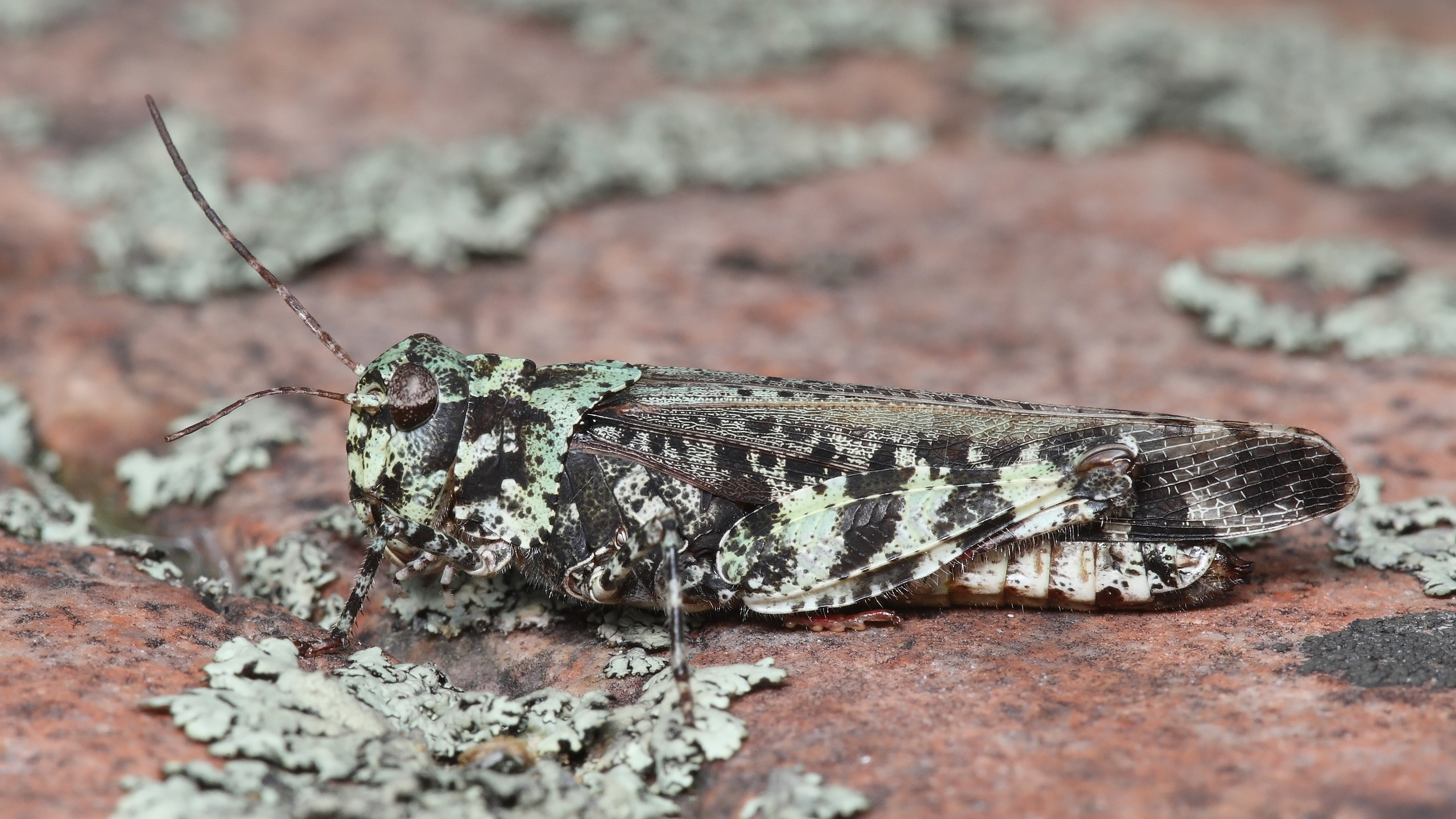

Scientific classification
- Kingdom: Animalia
- Phylum: Arthropoda
- Clade: Pancrustacea
- Class: Insecta
- Order: Orthoptera
- Suborder: Caelifera
- Family: Acrididae
- Subfamily: Oedipodinae
- Tribe: Trimerotropini
- Genus: Spharagemon
- Species: S. marmorata

Binomial name
- Spharagemon marmorata (Harris & T.W., 1841)

= Spharagemon marmorata =

Marbled grasshopper

Species of grasshopper

Spharagemon marmorata, the marbled grasshopper, is a species of band-winged grasshopper in the family Acrididae. It is found in eastern North America.

== Subspecies ==
These subspecies belong to the species Spharagemon marmorata:

- Spharagemon marmorata marmorata (Harris, 1841) (Northern Marbled Locust)
- Spharagemon marmorata marmoratum (northern marbled grasshopper)
- Spharagemon marmorata picta (Scudder, 1877)
- Spharagemon marmorata pictum (southern marbled grasshopper)
