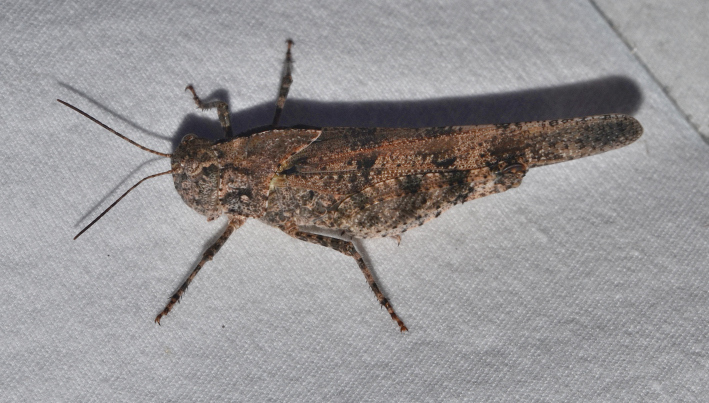
- Spharagemon cristatum, Florida

Scientific classification
- Kingdom: Animalia
- Phylum: Arthropoda
- Clade: Pancrustacea
- Class: Insecta
- Order: Orthoptera
- Suborder: Caelifera
- Family: Acrididae
- Genus: Spharagemon
- Species: S. cristatum

Binomial name
- Spharagemon cristatum Scudder, 1875

Synonyms
- Dissosteira cristatum (Scudder, 1875); Eximacris superbum (Hebard, 1937); Spharagemon collare subsp. cristatum Scudder, 1875; Spharagemon superbum Hebard, 1937

= Spharagemon cristatum =

Species of grasshopper

Spharagemon cristatum, known generally as the ridgeback grasshopper or ridgeback sand grasshopper, is a species of band-winged grasshopper in the family Acrididae. It is found in North America.
