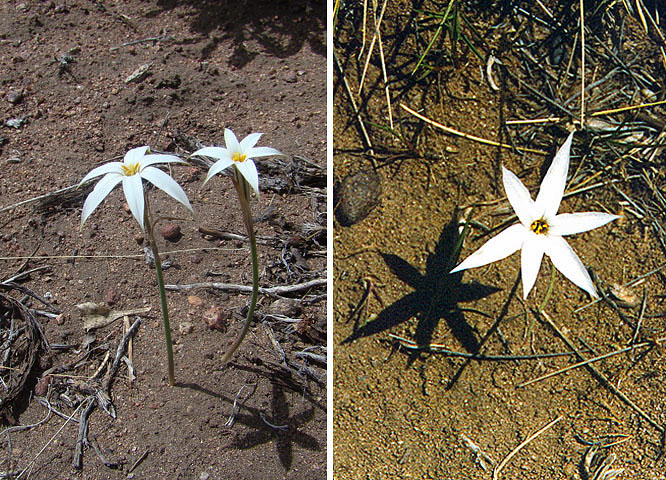
- Tristagama patagonicum

Scientific classification
- Kingdom: Plantae
- Clade: Tracheophytes
- Clade: Angiosperms
- Clade: Monocots
- Order: Asparagales
- Family: Amaryllidaceae
- Subfamily: Allioideae
- Tribe: Gilliesieae
- Genus: Tristagma; Poepp. (1833)

Type species
- Tristagma nivale Poepp.

Species
- 17; see text

Synonyms
- Garaventia Looser (1941); Gardinia Bertero (1829), not validly published; Steinmannia Phil. (1884), illegitimate homonym not Opiz 1852 (Polygonaceae)

= Tristagma =

Genus of flowering plants

Tristagma is a genus of South American plants in the onion subfamily with the Amaryllis family. It includes 17 species native to Peru, Argentina, and Chile in South America.

== Species ==
17 species are accepted.

1. Tristagma ameghinoi (Speg.) Speg. - Mendoza + Santa Cruz Provinces of Argentina
2. Tristagma anemophilum Ravenna - Neuquén Province of Argentina
3. Tristagma berteroi (Kunth) S.C.Arroyo & Sassone - Valparaíso Region of Chile
4. Tristagma bivalve (Hook. ex Lindl.) Traub - central Chile
5. Tristagma circinatum (Sandwith) Traub - Neuquén Province of Argentina
6. Tristagma gracile (Phil.) Traub - central Chile
7. Tristagma graminifolium (Phil.) Ravenna - central Chile
8. Tristagma lineatum Ravenna - Santiago Region of Chile
9. Tristagma lomarum Ravenna - Arequipa Region of Peru
10. Tristagma nivale Poepp. - central + southern Chile, southern Argentina
11. Tristagma patagonicum (Baker) Traub - southern Argentina
12. Tristagma poeppigianum (Gay) Traub - central Chile
13. Tristagma porrifolium (Poepp.) Traub - central Chile
14. Tristagma sessile (Phil.) Traub - Chaco Province of Argentina, central Chile, Uruguay
15. Tristagma staminosum Ravenna - O'Higgins Region of Chile
16. Tristagma violaceum (Kunth) Traub – central Chile
17. Tristagma yauriense Ravenna - Puno Province of Peru

=== Formerly included ===
Several names have been coined using the name Tristagma but referring to species now considered better suited other genera including Ipheion, Leucocoryne, and Nothoscordum.

- Tristagma dimorphopetalum - Leucocoryne dimorphopetala
- Tristagma felipponei - Nothoscordum felipponei
- Tristagma hirtellum - Nothoscordum hirtellum
- Tristagma lloydiiflorum - Nothoscordum vittatum (Griseb.) Ravenna
- Tristagma lorentzii - Nothoscordum hirtellum subsp. lorentzii
- Tristagma mirabile Ravenna - Zephyranthes filifolia Herb. ex Kraenzl.
- Tristagma narcissoides - Leucocoryne coronata
- Tristagma peregrinans Ravenna - Ipheion uniflorum
- Tristagma sellowianum - Northoscordum felipponei
- Tristagma setaceum - Nothoscordum setaceum
- Tristagma subbiflorum - Nothoscordum bivalve
- Tristagma tweedieanum (Baker) Traub - Ipheion tweedieanum (Baker) Traub
- Tristagma uniflorum (Lindl.) Traub - Ipheion uniflorum
- Tristagma vittatum Griseb.) Traub - Nothoscordum vittatum

== Bibliography ==
- Sassone, Agostina B.; Giussani, Liliana M.; Guaglianone, Encarnación Rosa (30 April 2013). "Multivariate studies of Ipheion (Amaryllidaceae, Allioideae) and related genera". Plant Systematics and Evolution. 299 (8): 1561–1575. Bibcode:2013PSyEv.299.1561S. doi:10.1007/s00606-013-0819-5. hdl:11336/18970.
