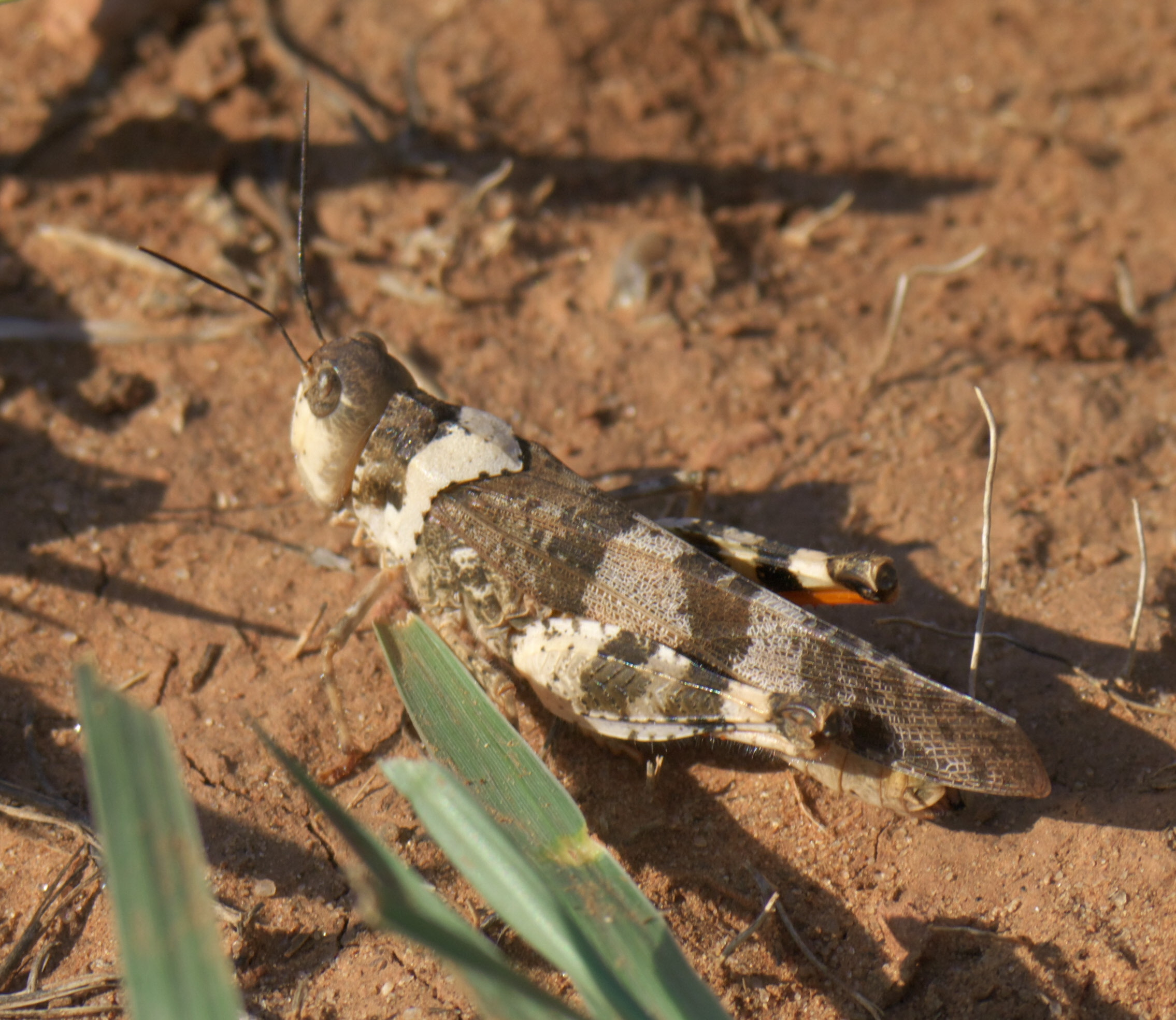

Scientific classification
- Kingdom: Animalia
- Phylum: Arthropoda
- Clade: Pancrustacea
- Class: Insecta
- Order: Orthoptera
- Suborder: Caelifera
- Family: Acrididae
- Genus: Spharagemon
- Species: S. equale

Binomial name
- Spharagemon equale (Say, 1825)

= Spharagemon equale =

Species of grasshopper

Spharagemon equale, known generally as the Say's grasshopper or orange-legged grasshopper, is a species of band-winged grasshopper in the family Acrididae. It is found in North America.
