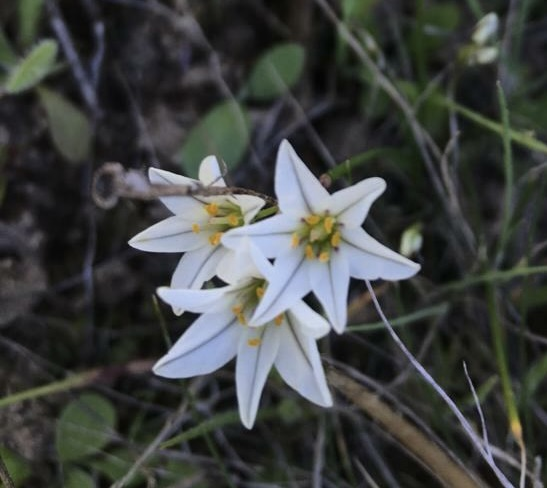

Scientific classification
- Kingdom: Plantae
- Clade: Tracheophytes
- Clade: Angiosperms
- Clade: Monocots
- Order: Asparagales
- Family: Amaryllidaceae
- Subfamily: Allioideae
- Genus: Tristagma
- Species: T. bivalve

Binomial name
- Tristagma bivalve (Hook. ex Lindl.) Traub

= Tristagma bivalve =

Species of plant

Tristagma bivalve is a species of flowering plant in the family Amaryllidaceae. It is a perennial herb endemic to Chile, where it is distributed between the Atacama and Araucanía regions.
