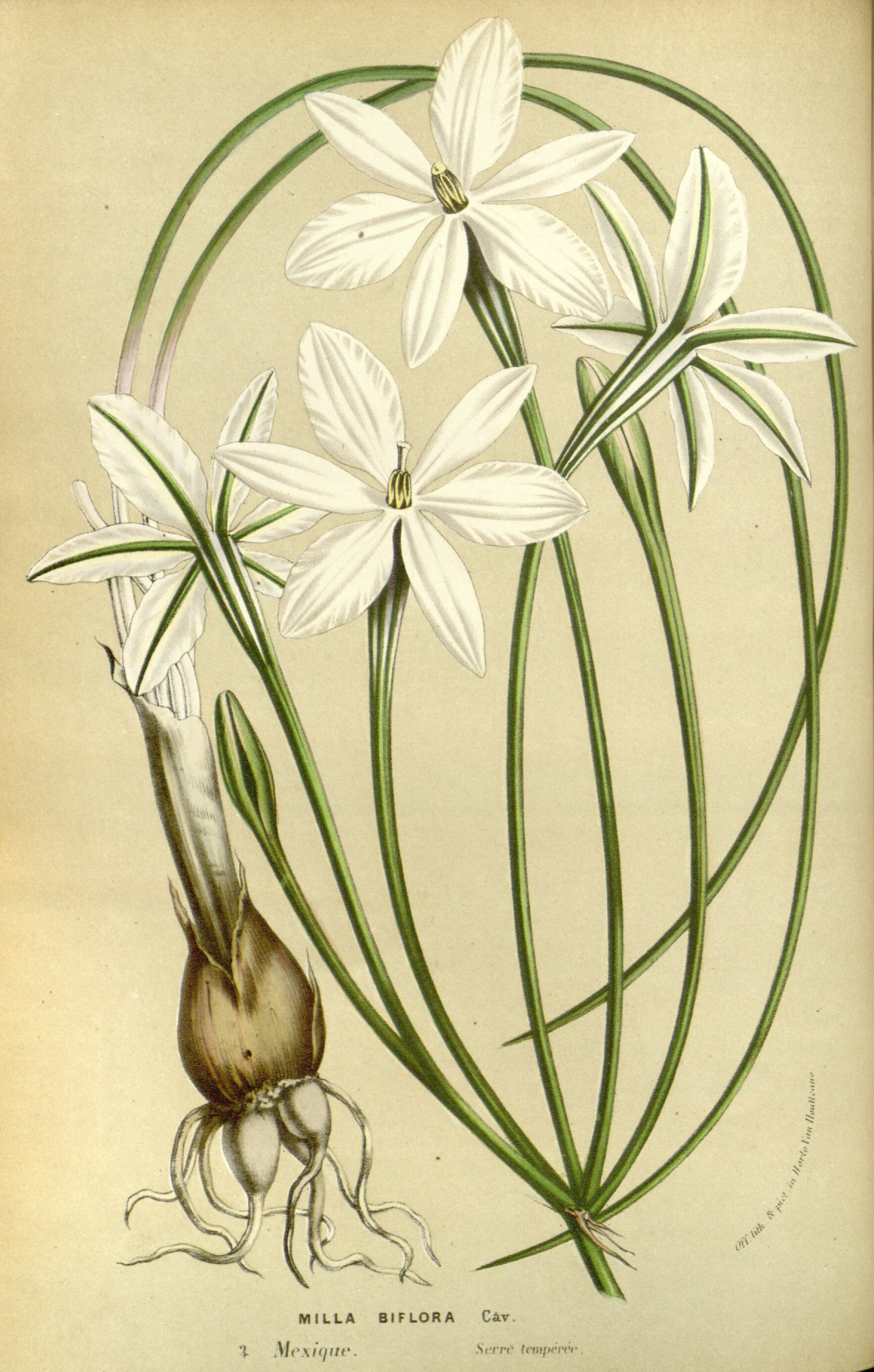
- 1861 illustration

Scientific classification
- Kingdom: Plantae
- Clade: Tracheophytes
- Clade: Angiosperms
- Clade: Monocots
- Order: Asparagales
- Family: Asparagaceae
- Subfamily: Brodiaeoideae
- Genus: Milla
- Species: M. biflora

Binomial name
- Milla biflora Cav.

Synonyms
- Askolame biflora (Cav.) Raf.; Gyrenia biflora (Cav.) Knowles & Westc. ex Loudon; Blandfordia uniflora Willd. ex Kunth; Diphalangium graminifolium S.Schauer

= Milla biflora =

Mexican star

Species of flowering plant

Milla biflora, Mexican star, is a species of flowering plant native to Arizona, New Mexico, Texas, Mexico, Honduras and Guatemala, where it grows at 1,000–2,700 m (3,300–8,900 ft) elevation. It is perennial, growing from a 1–2 cm (0.4–0.8 in) corm, and flowering in summer. Inflorescences of 1–9 white flowers are borne on scapes 4–55 cm (1.6–21.7 in) long. The 2–10 leaves are each 1 mm (0.04 in) wide and half to equally as long as the scape. The fruits are ovoid capsules, 1.5–2 cm (0.6–0.8 in) long.
