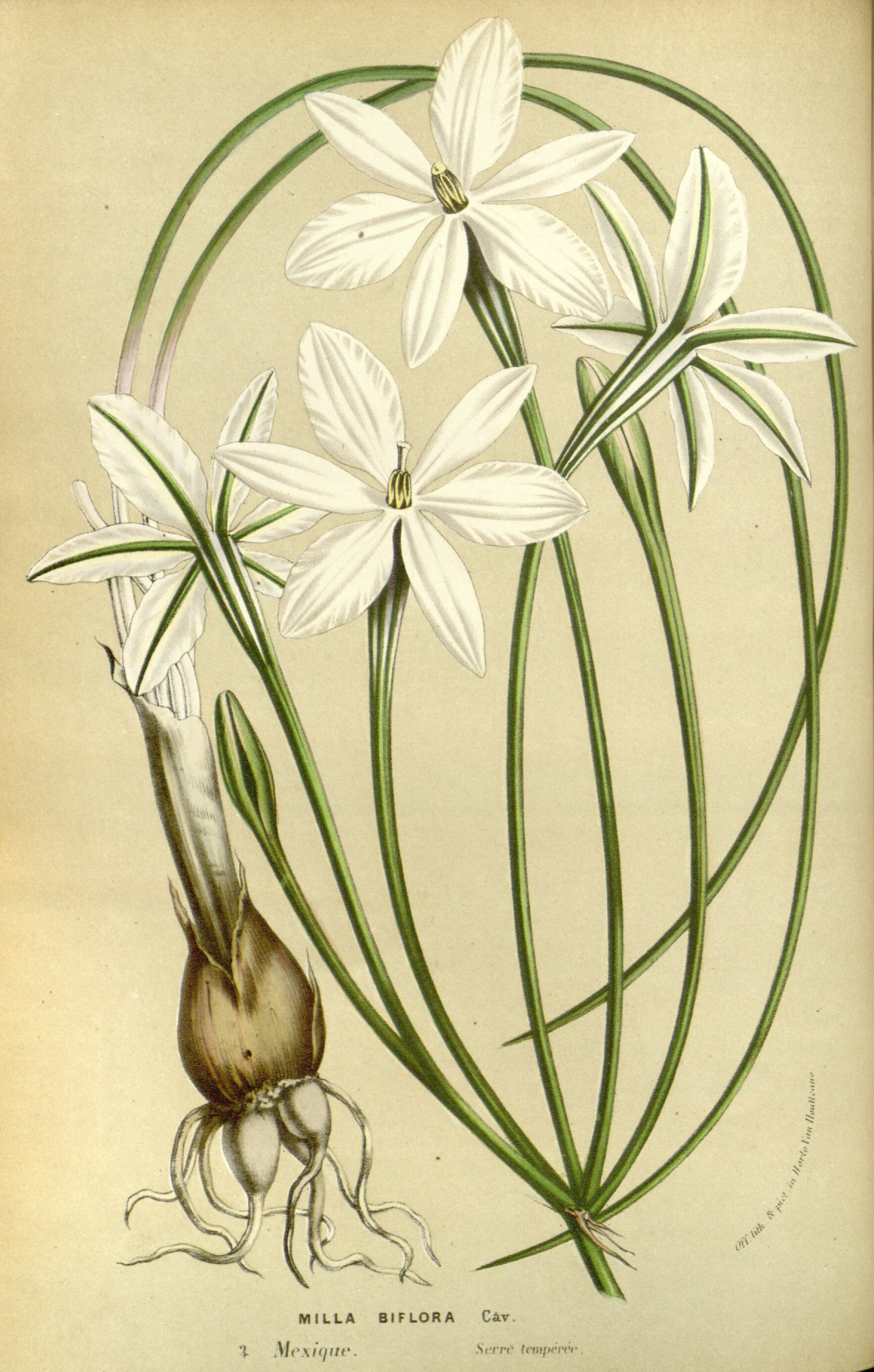
- Milla biflora 1861 illustration

Scientific classification
- Kingdom: Plantae
- Clade: Tracheophytes
- Clade: Angiosperms
- Clade: Monocots
- Order: Asparagales
- Family: Asparagaceae
- Subfamily: Brodiaeoideae
- Genus: Milla; Cav.

Type species
- Milla biflora Cav.

Synonyms
- Askolame Raf.; Gyrenia Knowles & Westc. ex Loudon; Diphalangium S.Schauer

= Milla =

Mexican star

Genus of flowering plants

Milla, the Mexican star, is a genus of monocotyledonous plants in the family Asparagaceae, subfamily Brodiaeoideae. They are native mostly to Mexico, with one species extending into Guatemala, Honduras, Arizona, Texas and New Mexico.

Milla contains ten accepted species:

1. Milla biflora Cav. - widespread across most of Mexico plus Arizona, New Mexico, Texas, Guatemala and Honduras
2. Milla bryanii I.M.Johnst. - Coahuila
3. Milla delicata H.E.Moore - Guerrero
4. Milla filifolia T.M.Howard - Morelos
5. Milla magnifica H.E.Moore - Guerrero, Morelos
6. Milla mexicana T.M.Howard - Puebla, Oaxaca
7. Milla mortoniana H.E.Moore - Guerrero
8. Milla oaxacana Ravenna - Oaxaca
9. Milla potosina T.M.Howard - San Luis Potosí
10. Milla rosea H.E.Moore - Nuevo León
