= Lochend =

Lochend may refer to the following places:

== Scotland ==
- Lochend, Edinburgh, a suburb of Edinburgh, named after
  - Lochend House, an occupied house containing the remnants of a 16th-century castle
  - Lochend Loch (Edinburgh), a small lake near Lochend House
  - Lochend Park, a public park in Edinburgh
- Lochend, Glasgow, a neighbourhood in the Glasgow suburb of Easterhouse
  - Lochend Community High School in Easterhouse, Glasgow
- Lochend Castle, Campbeltown, a former castle at Campbeltown, Argyll and Bute
- Lochend (Loch Ness), a hamlet on the northern shore of Loch Ness
- Lochend Loch (Coylton), a small lake in Ayrshire
- Lochend Loch in Drumpellier Country Park, Lanarkshire
- Lochend Woods, Dunbar, East Lothian

== Other countries ==
- Lochend Colliery, a former mine near Newcastle, New South Wales, Australia
- Lochend House, Campbelltown, an historic home in Adelaide, South Australia
- Lochend Road, Alberta, Canada

== See also ==
- Baillie baronets of Lochend (1636)
- Warrender baronets, of Lochend (1715)
- Lochend Church and Farm, in Beeswing, Dumfries and Galloway, Scotland
