= Piershill =

Suburb of Edinburgh, Scotland

Coordinates: 55°57′19″N 3°8′38″W

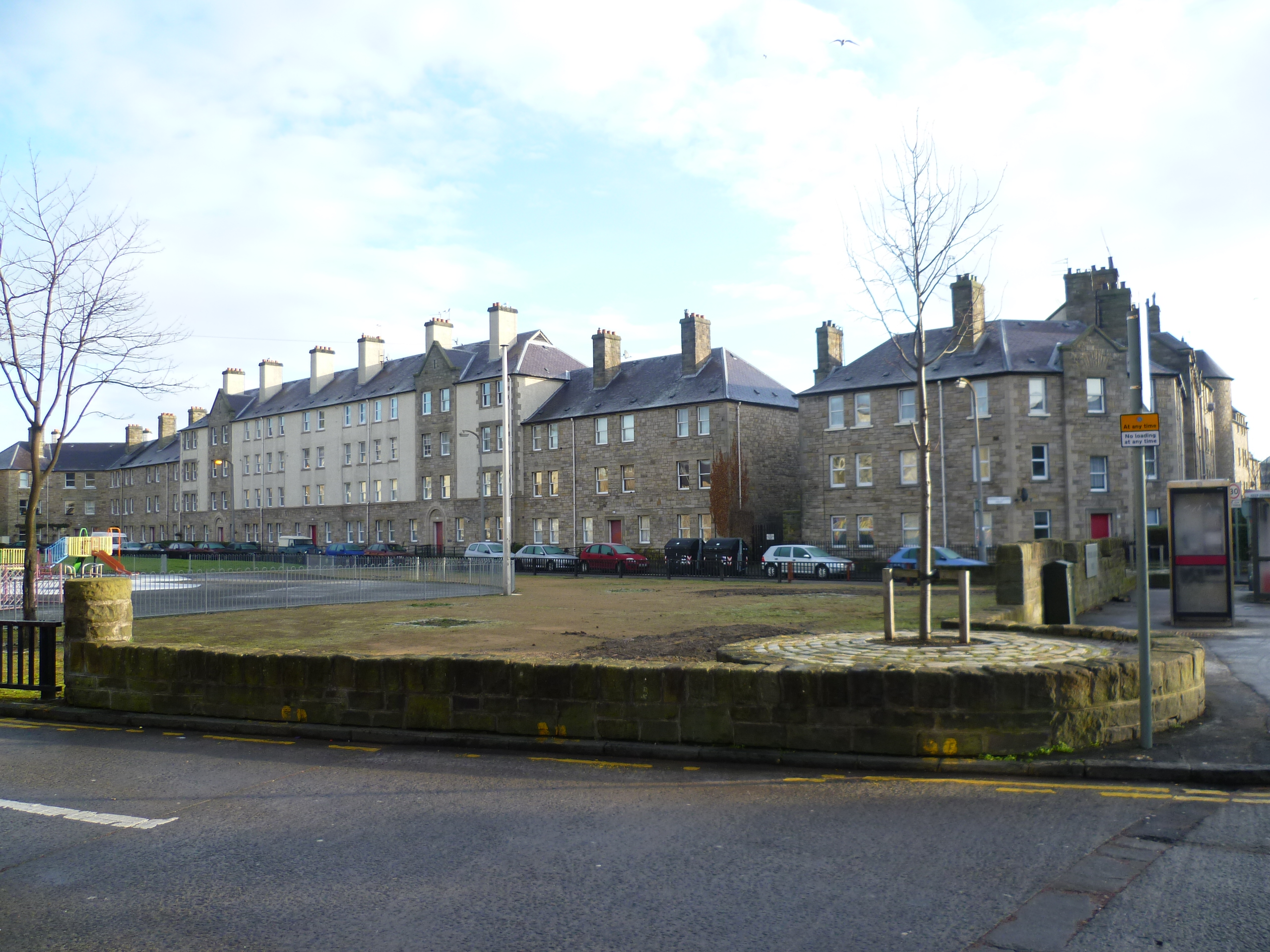
- Piershill

- Location within the City of Edinburgh council area Location within Scotland
- Council area: City of Edinburgh
- Country: Scotland
- Sovereign state: United Kingdom
- Postcode district: EH
- Dialling code: 0131
- Police: Scotland
- Fire: Scottish
- Ambulance: Scottish

Piershill is a suburb of north east Edinburgh, Scotland, in the shadow of Arthur's Seat. It is mainly residential, with local amenities including a large supermarket and filling station, bank, public library, optician, two pharmacies, a pub, several takeaway restaurants and specialist retailers along with public houses.

Piershill existed as a distinct area in Restalrig before 1500 and is recorded in 1588 as Peirieshill. The name may derive from the French name Pierre or from the Scots persche relating to other willow names in the area.

Piershill is adjoined by Mountcastle and Willowbrae to the south, Jock's Lodge and Meadowbank just to the west, Portobello to the east and Restalrig and Craigentinny to the north.

== Buildings ==
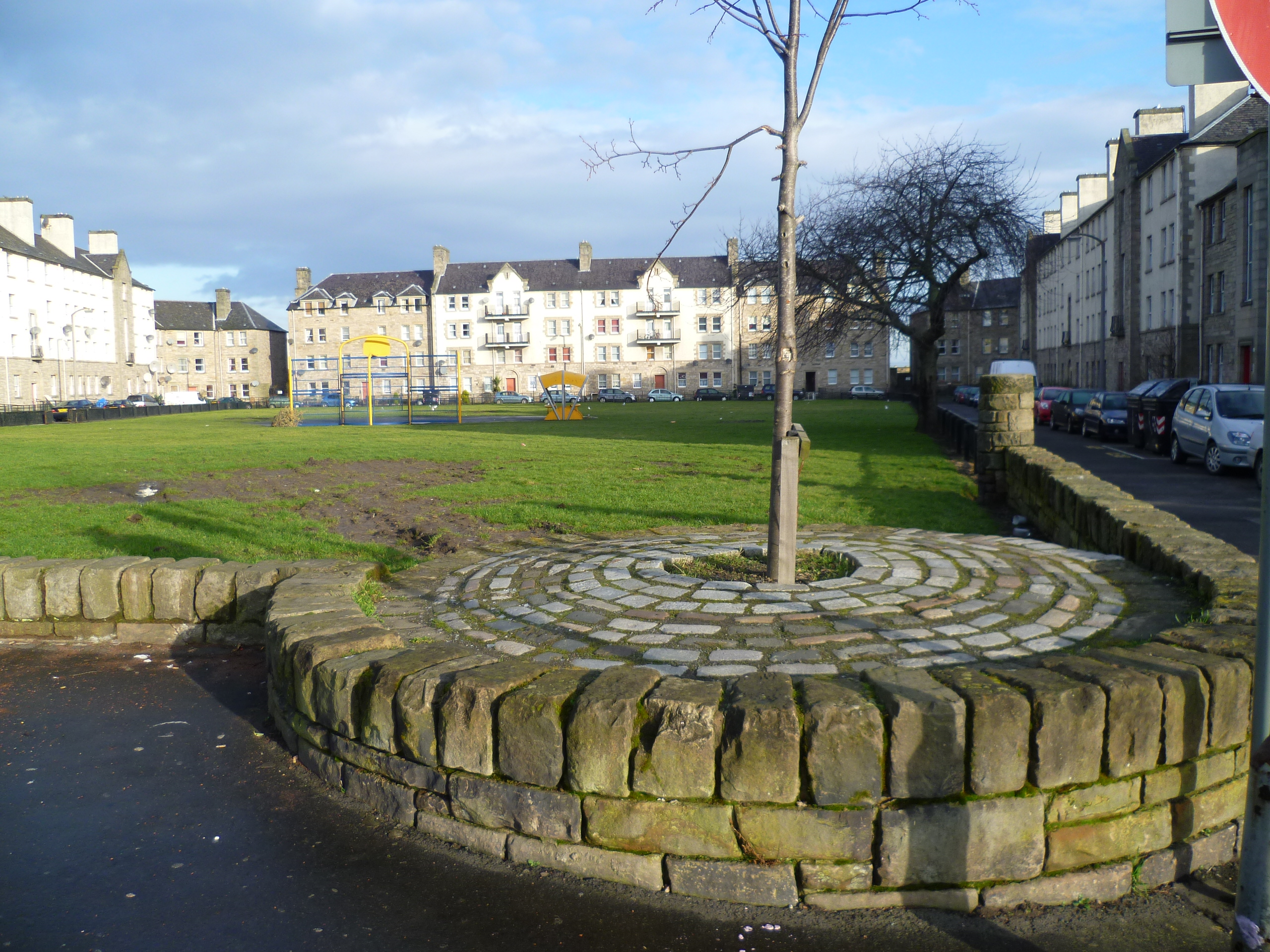
Boundary walling

The Piershill Square East/West/Portobello Road tenements, containing 342 dwellings, were built 1937-8 by the Edinburgh Corporation Council. They were designed by Ebenezer James MacRae (1881–1951), Edinburgh's City Architect and members of his architectural team, Malcolm Murchison, James Tweedie and Andrew Rollo. MacRae was City Architect for twenty years and his infill developments and reinterpretation of Scots vernacular architecture are an important part of Edinburgh's inter-war heritage. These tenements reflect MacRae's tours of Europe in their planning and layout.

There is a great deal of listed buildings, with there being more than not. Unfortunately, many of the original multi-pane sash windows have been replaced with uPVC (without listed building consent) as the flats were sold under the right to buy. They were built on the site of Piershill Barracks, and re-used the stone facings from the old buildings. They are a reinterpretation of the traditional tenement, a housing type more usually associated with the Nineteenth century.

The Piershill Place and Piershill Terrace tenement façades were mostly constructed out of red sandstone (unlike grey sandstone on the Piershill Square buildings). They were built in the 1900’s decade to meet the demands of housing demands for the growth of the population between Edinburgh and Portobello.

== Transport ==
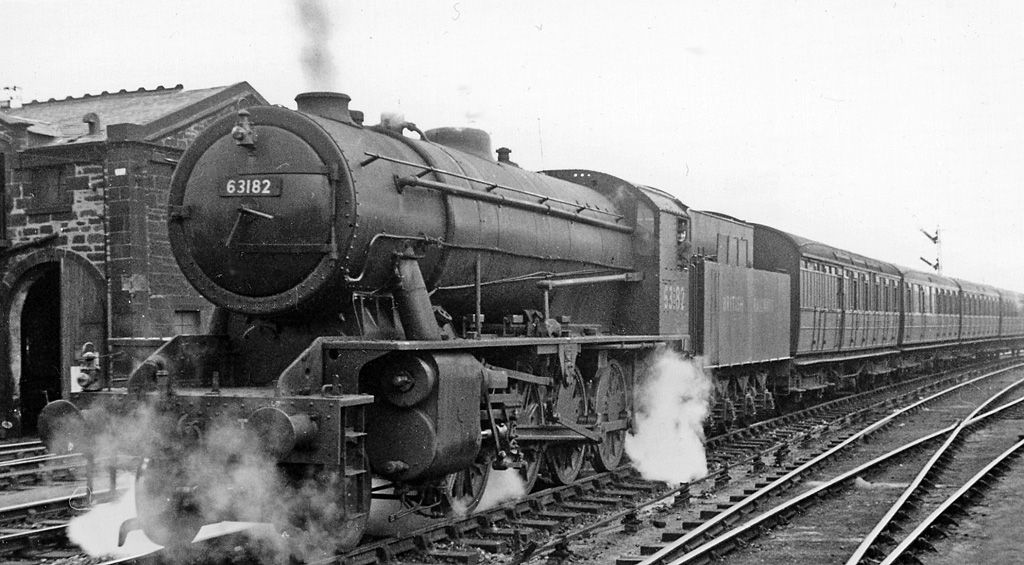
Train near St Margaret's Locomotive Depot, Piershill

The East Coast Main Line between Edinburgh and London lies to the immediate north of the estate. Smokey Brae lies immediately west of Piershill, being the local name for the route to Restalrig which travels beneath the railway line. Immediately before the first bridge on the high wall to the right can be seen the remains of the original back gate to Piershill Barracks, now walled up but still with the legend BACK GATE visible on the wall; there is also a bricked up doorway to the left of the back gate.

As well as the East Coast Main Line railway there is also a busy crossroads, the main A1 road trunk route between Edinburgh and London and the A1140 to Portobello. The area is well served by Lothian Buses with services 4, 5, 15, 26, 45 and N26.

== Piershill Cemetery ==
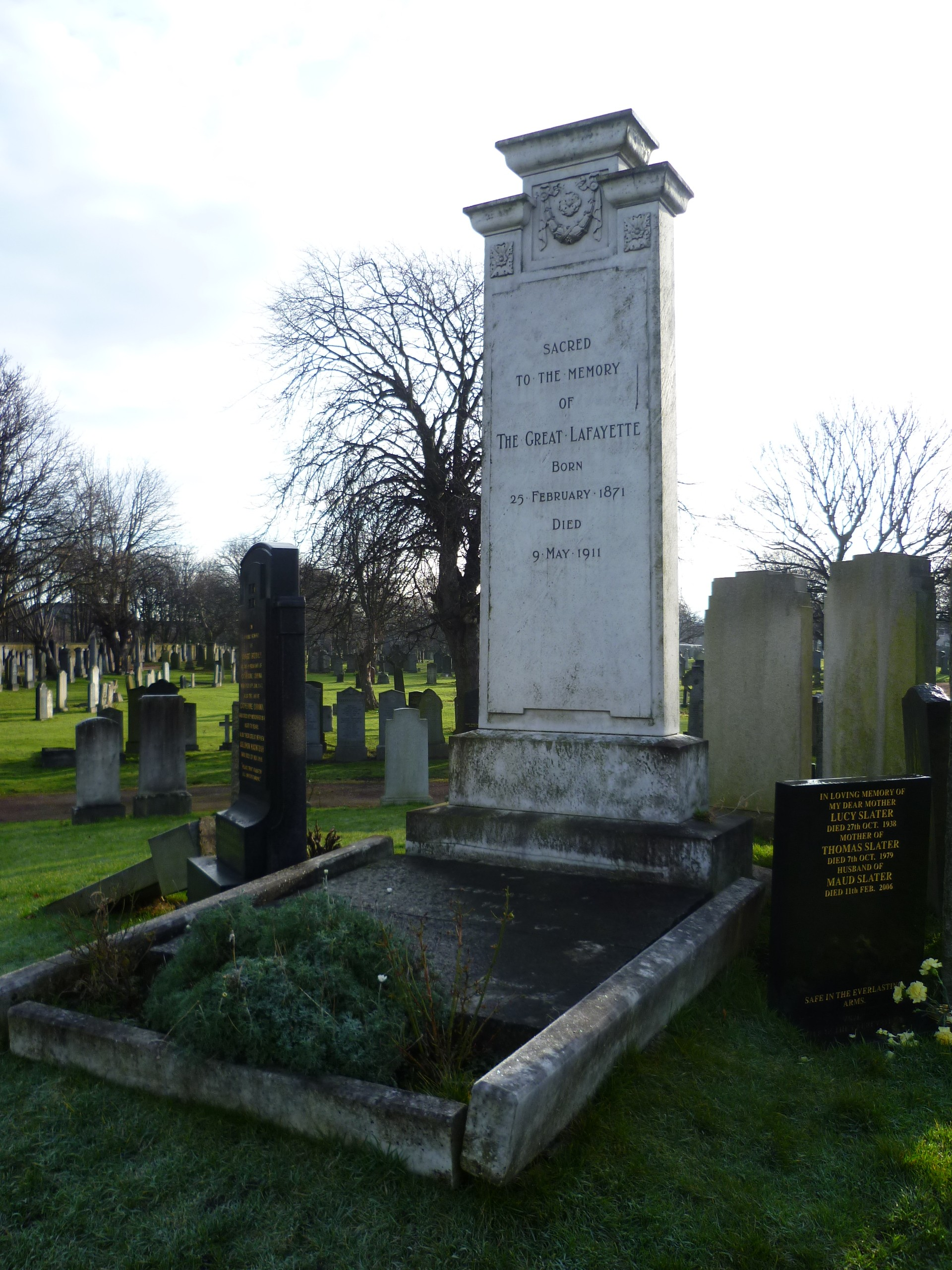
Grave of The Great Lafayette

The cemetery appears unexceptional but includes a number of curious military memorials, and 63 Commonwealth war graves. To the east there is a large section reserved for Jewish burials and to the north-west is Scotland's first and Edinburgh's only Pet Cemetery. Notable monuments include:

- Multiple members of the Codona family, fairground entertainers
- Memorial to David Norman Duncan, engineer lost in the disastrous test run on the submarine Thetis on 1 June 1939
- Samuel Evans (VC) (d.1901)
- Sigmund Neuberger, a famous illusionist known as The Great Lafayette, along with his dog Beauty
- George Wilson, a recipient of the Victoria Cross
- Several monuments to members of the Order of Free Gardeners
- Monument to ex-soldiers dying in the service of the Earl Haig Fund
- Monument to the Jewish soldiers of Edinburgh who lost their lives in the two world wars
- Monument to soldiers of the Highland Light Infantry
- Monument to soldiers of the Black Watch
- Monument to soldiers of the Royal Scots Greys
- Two Czechoslovak service personnel of World War II. Note these lie in the central Jewish section

== Community Flat ==
Until 2016 Piershill Square West had a "Community Flat", run by the National Health Service (NHS). Staffed full-time by a coordinator, with additional staff from various agencies supporting the project on a weekly basis, the Community Flat was run in partnership between the City of Edinburgh Council and NHS Lothian. It offered services including a residents' group; a parent and toddler group; stop smoking services; state benefits advice; social groups; links to Working Towards Health; and links to Action for Jobs with Jobcentre Plus. The flat was predominantly for use by residents of the two squares in Piershill, Portobello Road and the top of Restalrig Road South, but from March 2007 was part of the greater Regeneration Outcome Agreement area of Restalrig, Lochend and Craigentinny. It has now been returned to the Council by the NHS and is in ordinary housing use.

== See also ==
- Edinburgh, Leith and Newhaven Railway
- Edinburgh Suburban and Southside Junction Railway
