= St Ninian and Triduana's Church, Edinburgh =

Coordinates: 55.9588°N 3.1547°W

Ss Ninian and Triduana Roman Catholic Church, Edinburgh
- Ss Ninian and Triduana Roman Catholic Church, Edinburgh
- Denomination: Roman Catholic
- Website: Ss Ninian & Triduana RC Church

History
- Dedication: St Ninian and St Triduana

Administration
- Province: St Andrews and Edinburgh
- Archdiocese: St Andrews and Edinburgh
- Deanery: City of Edinburgh

Clergy
- Archbishop: Leo Cushley
- Priest(s): Rev. Prof. Piotr Krakowiak, SAC

St Ninian and St Triduana's Church, Edinburgh is a Catholic church in the Restalrig district of Edinburgh, Scotland.

== History ==
The original church was a wooden building and was established in 1906. The building of the current church began in 1932 and it was consecrated on 28 May 1933.

It is named after two ancient Scottish saints, Ninian and Triduana.

The church was renovated in the 1990s which included altering a portion of the nave to create a hall for meetings

The building was designed by Sir Giles Gilbert Scott, whose original plan was not completed due to the outbreak of World War II.

It is a Category B listed building.

== Parish organisation ==
From 2017 the parishes in Edinburgh were organised into clusters to better coordinate their resources. Ss Ninian and Triduana's is one of four parishes in Cluster 1 along with St Mary's Cathedral, St Patrick's and St Albert's.
