= St. Mary's Cathedral, Edinburgh =

St. Mary's Cathedral, Edinburgh may refer to:

- St Mary's Cathedral, Edinburgh (Catholic)
- St Mary's Cathedral, Edinburgh (Episcopal)
