= Baillie baronets =

There have been three baronetcies created for persons with the surname Baillie, one in the Baronetage of Nova Scotia and two in the Baronetage of the United Kingdom. As of 2026 one creation is extant.

- Baillie baronets of Lochend (1636)
- Baillie baronets of Portman Square (1812), second patent 1819 with seat Berkeley Square, later Mackenzie baronets
- Baillie baronets of Polkemmet (1823)
