= Edinburgh Cathedral =

Edinburgh Cathedral may refer to:

- St Giles' Cathedral, Edinburgh (Church of Scotland)
- St Mary's Cathedral, Edinburgh (Episcopal)
- St Mary's Cathedral, Edinburgh (Roman Catholic)
