= Samuel Evans (VC) =

Scottish recipient of the Victoria Cross

Samuel Evans VC
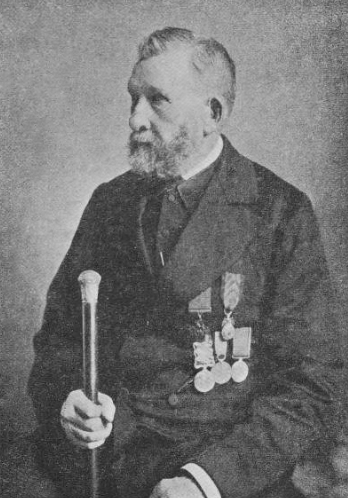
- Born: c. 1821; Paisley, Renfrewshire, Scotland
- Died: 4 October 1901 (aged 80); Edinburgh, Scotland
- Burial place: Piershill Cemetery, Edinburgh
- Military career
- Allegiance: United Kingdom
- Branch: British Army
- Rank: Private
- Units: 19th Regiment of Foot
- Conflicts: Crimean War; First Anglo-Chinese War
- Awards: Victoria Cross; Médaille militaire
- Other work: Lodge keeper at the Palace of Holyroodhouse

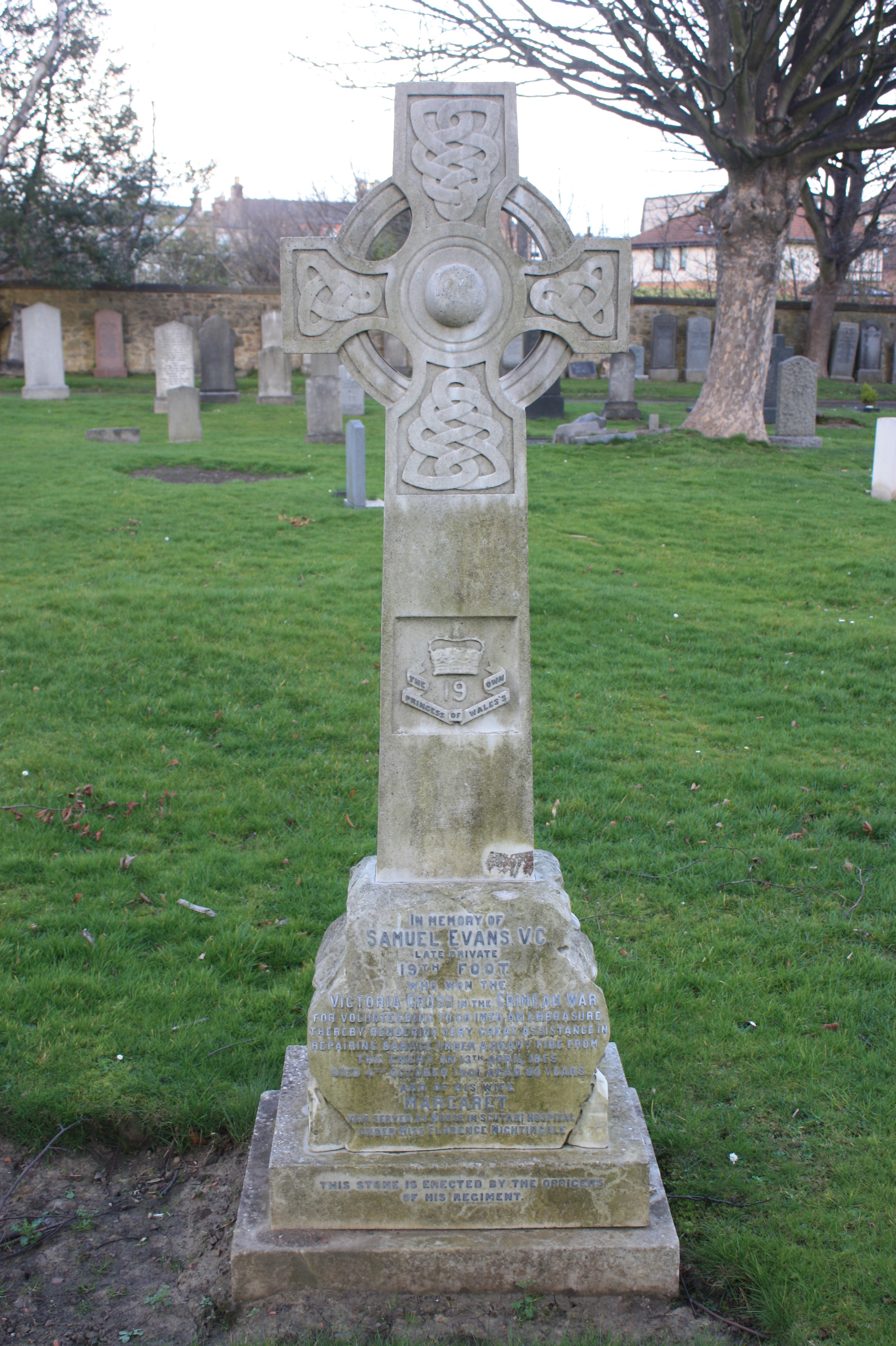
The grave of Samuel Evans VC, Piershill Cemetery, Edinburgh

Samuel Evans VC (c. 1821 – 4 October 1901) was a Scottish recipient of the Victoria Cross, the highest and most prestigious award for gallantry in the face of the enemy that can be awarded to British and Commonwealth forces.

== Early life ==
He was born Samuel Evens in Paisley, Renfrewshire in 1821, the son of Anne and James Evens, a weaver. He initially followed in his father's footsteps as a weaver of Paisley shawls, but in September 1839 he enlisted in the 26th Regiment of Foot at Gallowgate Barracks, as 1535 Private Evens. He joined his regiment in India in October 1840.

The regiment moved to China and he was part of the China War of 1842. In 1843 the regiment was billeted at Edinburgh Castle and remained there until 1851. In 1852 he volunteered for the 19th Foot Regiment to serve in the Kaffir Wars in South Africa, with a new service no. as 2721 Private Evans, remaining Evans for the rest of his life. In 1854 he sailed to Varna with his regiment to serve in the Crimean War.

== The Winning of the VC ==
He was about 34 years old, and a private in the 19th Regiment of Foot (later The Yorkshire Regiment (Alexandra, Princess of Wales's Own)), British Army during the Crimean War when the following deed took place for which he was awarded the VC.

On 13 April 1855 at Sebastopol, Crimean Peninsula, Private Evans volunteered to go into an embrasure to repair a breach. He and another private went into the battery and leapt into the embrasure, where they carried out the necessary repairs under very heavy enemy fire.

He did not receive the medal until 26 June 1857. He traveled to London from Edinburgh and was presented the medal in a ceremony in Hyde Park, receiving it personally from Queen Victoria.

His Victoria Cross is displayed in the Green Howards Museum, Richmond, Yorkshire, England.

== Later life ==
On 8 September 1855 he was severely wounded during the attack on Redan and after some time at Scutari Hospital was returned to Britain. He was discharged from the army, unfit for service, on 13 May 1856. It was while in hospital that he met a widow, Margaret McNichol who had been invited to nurse at the Scutari Hospital by Florence Nightingale and upon returning to Edinburgh they were married.

Through various connections (and presumably a degree of fame) he acquired a job as lodge-keeper at Holyrood Palace, living in a charming lodge at the entry to Holyrood Park. In the 1870s he left Edinburgh and bought a shop in Dumfries but this was not a great success.

In 1888 he returned to Edinburgh, living in a humble flat at 332 Lawnmarket on the Royal Mile.

He died in 1901 and is buried with his wife Margaret in Piershill Cemetery in eastern Edinburgh.
