= Andrew Wood (surgeon) =

Scottish surgeon (1810–1881)

Andrew Wood (1 September 1810–25 January 1881) was a Scottish surgeon who served as President of the Royal College of Surgeons of Edinburgh from 1855 to 1857.

== Life ==
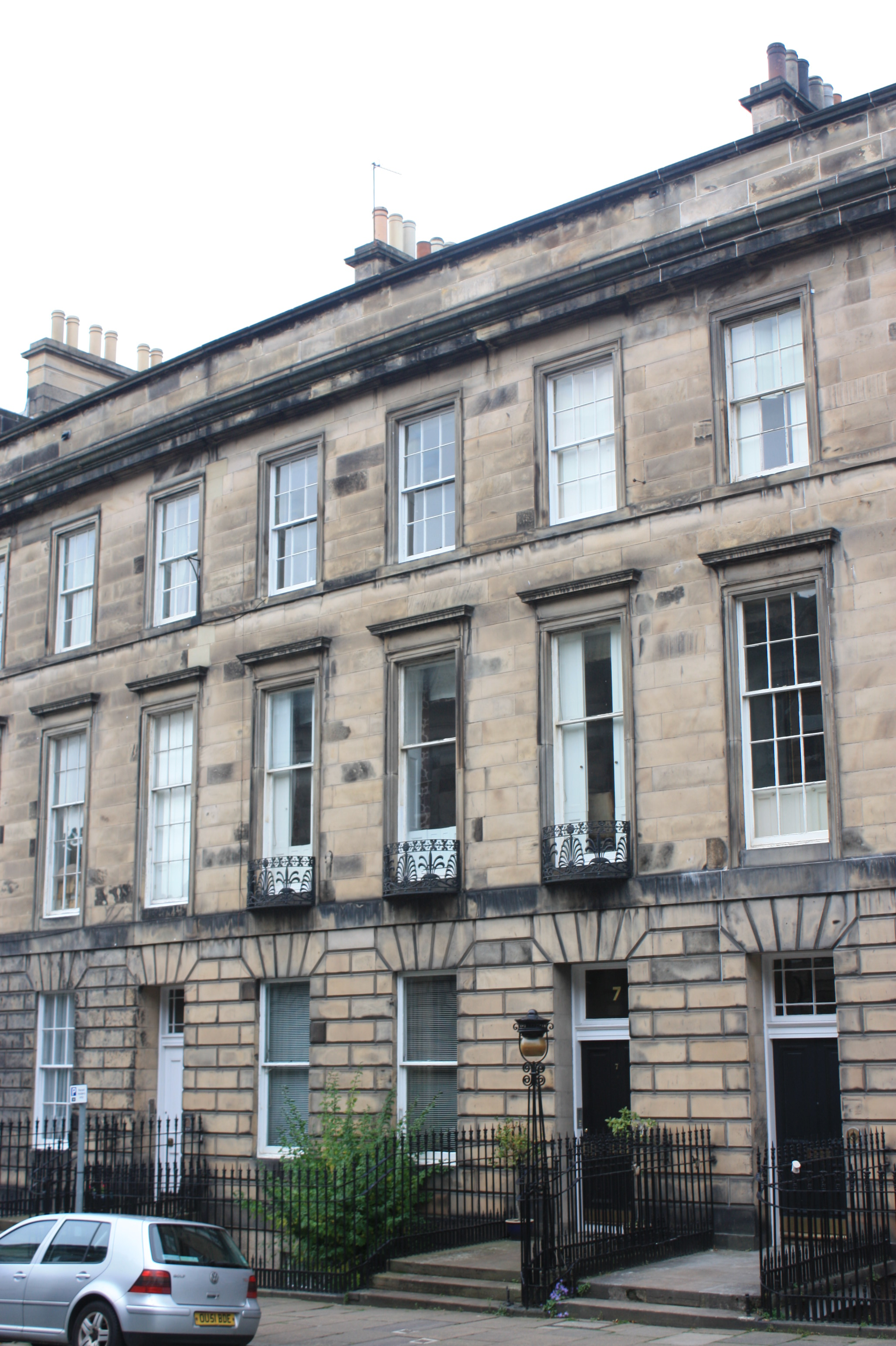
9 Darnaway Street

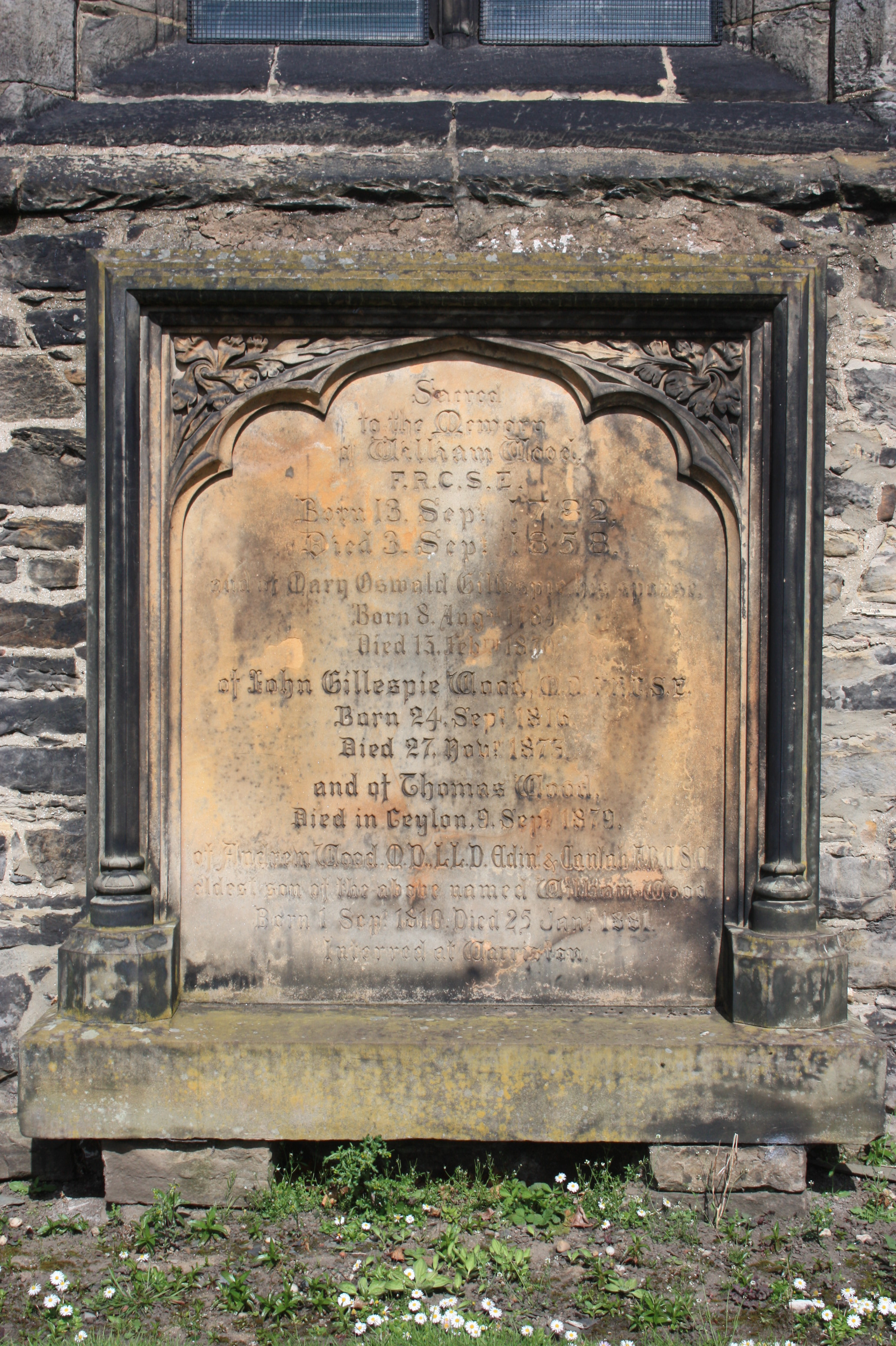
The Wood memorial, Restalrig Churchyard

He was born at 42 South Hanover Street in Edinburgh on 1 September 1810 the son of Mary Oswald Gillespie and her husband, William Wood FRSE (1782-1858), a surgeon. He was educated at the High School in Edinburgh and then studied medicine at the University of Edinburgh receiving his doctorate (MD) in 1831.

He joined his father operating from premises at 87 George Street in Edinburgh's New Town close to their home. Wood variously worked also at the New Town Dispensary, Heriot's Hospital, Merchant Maiden Hospital, Trades Maiden Hospital and at Edinburgh Royal Infirmary (rising to Manager of the latter). In 1837 he was elected a member of the Harveian Society of Edinburgh.

In 1855 he succeeded Robert Omond as President of the Royal College of Surgeons of Edinburgh, a role also previously held by his father William. In 1857 Wood was elected a member of the Aesculapian Club.

In 1863 he was elected a Fellow of the Royal Society of Edinburgh his proposer being John Hutton Balfour.

He died at home, 9 Darnaway Street on the Moray Estate in western Edinburgh on 25 January 1881. He is buried in Warriston Cemetery but also memorialised on his parents grave in Restalrig churchyard in eastern Edinburgh, beside Alexander Wood, Lord Wood, his great uncle.

== Artistic recognition ==
Wood was portrayed by Agnes Campbell Imlach, daughter of his colleague, Francis Brodie Imlach.

== Family ==
He was father to William Wood FRSE, also a surgeon.
