= Triduana =

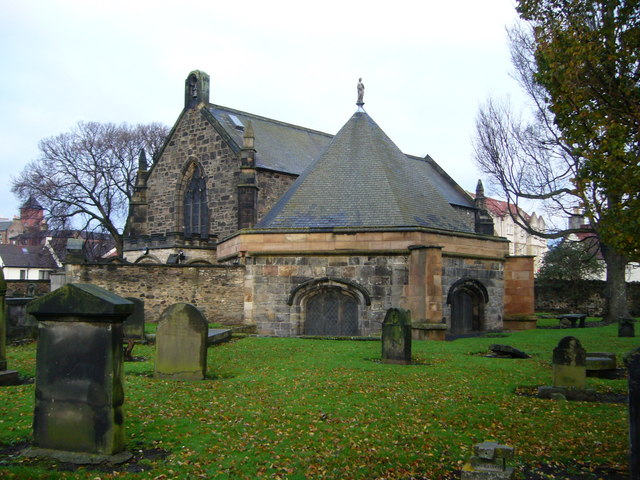
- The 15th-century St Triduana's Aisle, Restalrig, Edinburgh
- Died: c. 7th or 8th century Restalrig
- Venerated in: Catholic Church Eastern Orthodox Church Anglican Church
- Major shrine: Restalrig
- Feast: 8 October

Saint Triduana, also known as Trodline, Tredwell, and in Norse as Trøllhaena, was an early Christian woman, associated with various places in Scotland. She lived at an unknown time, probably between the 4th and 8th centuries AD.

According to the 16th-century Aberdeen Breviary, Triduana was born in the Greek city of Colosse, and travelled from Constantinople with Saint Rule, who brought the bones of Saint Andrew to Scotland in the 4th century AD. A pious woman, she settled at Rescobie near Forfar in Angus, but her beauty attracted the attentions of a King of the Picts named Nechtan. The legend tells that to stall these unwanted attentions, Triduana tore out her own eyes and gave them to Nechtan. Afterwards, she was associated with curing eye disorders. She spent her later years in Restalrig, Lothian, and healed the blind who came to her. She was buried at Restalrig when she died.

The 17th-century Acta Sanctorum records a story of a blind English woman miraculously cured by Triduana. The saint appears to her in a dream, and instructs her to travel to Restalrig. She does so, and regains her sight at Triduana's tomb. The woman's daughter is later cured of blindness after praying to Triduana.

In the 12th century, the Norse Earl of Orkney Harald Maddadsson punished bishop John of Caithness by having him blinded. According to the 13th-century Orkneyinga Saga, John prayed to "Trøllhaena", and later regained his sight when brought to her "resting place", possibly referring to a local northern shrine rather than Restalrig.

The principal centre of devotion to Triduana was at Restalrig, now part of Edinburgh. The parish church has been rebuilt, but the associated 15th-century St Triduana's Aisle (originally two-storeyed) survives. This partly subterranean structure often flooded in the past, and was at one time assumed to be an unusually large and elaborate holy well (St Triduana's Well). The exterior of the aisle was heavily restored by the architect Thomas Ross in 1907, though its interior (which has a remarkable echo) retains its original rib-vault, and is a refined example of Scottish 15th-century architecture. Other dedications to Triduana include chapels at Ballachly (Caithness), Loth (Sutherland), and on Papa Westray in Orkney.

== St Tredwell's Chapel, Papa Westray ==
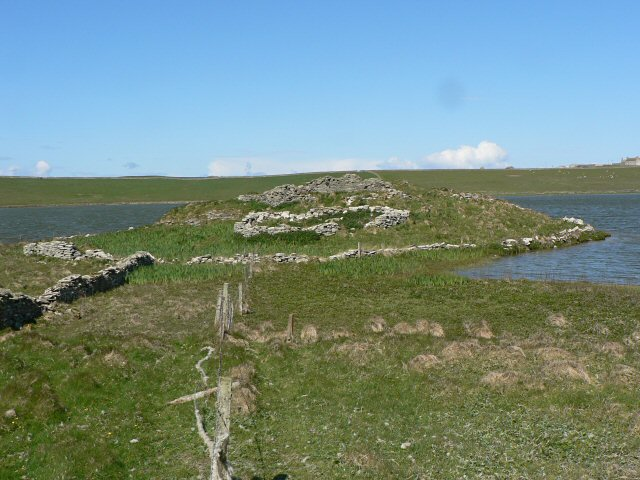
St Tredwell's Chapel, Papa Westray

St Tredwell's Chapel, Papa Westray is a renowned Orkney pilgrimage-centre, standing on a conical mound on a small peninsula (about 4.5 metres high and 35 metres across at the water level) in St Tredwell's Loch. The remains of the late medieval walls can be seen, built over Iron Age remains, including a tunnel leading to a circular building or broch. The thick walls of the chapel and records of tracery work indicate an important and well-founded establishment.

The chapel was surveyed by Sir Henry Dryden in 1870 when its walls, of variable thickness, were still up to 6 feet high and the interior measured 20 ft 3in by 13 ft 10ins. The chapel was cleared of rubble by William Traill around 1880. He found 30 copper coins dating between the reigns of Charles II and George III under the chapel floor, along with a female skeleton.

In The Archaeological Sites and Monuments of Papa Westray and Westray, R.G. Lamb (1983:19) notes:

Immediately outside the W wall Traill broke into a subterranean passage which he followed N then NW for some 10m, passing several sets of door-checks and a side-chamber and entering a 'circular building'. Finds from this structure, including a stone ball, are in NMAS (...); others are in Tankerness House Museum (...). The opening into the passage is now blocked by rubble; it is likely that this was part of a complex of late Iron Age buildings, on the wreckage of which the chapel was built. It is possible that that a broch lies at the core of the mound, on the lower SE slope of which a revetment-wall, 1.9m high and traceable for 11m, may be part of an outer wall or ringwork. A few metres to the N of the chapel are the footings of two small subrectangular buildings of indeterminate date. A cross-slab is said to have been seen some years ago in the deep water besides the islet, but an attempted recovery was unsuccessful.

St Tredwell or Triduana is associated as a 'holy virgin' with St Boniface in a medieval account of the mission from Jarrow to Pictland in 710 invited by King Nechtan. Legend has it that Nechtan fell in love with Triduana and praised her beautiful eyes. She responded by plucking them out and sending them to him skewered on a twig. Miraculous cures are associated with St Tredwell, particularly in those suffering from eye afflictions. Pilgrims travelled to Papay from all of Orkney and the north seeking a cure. Marwick, in a paper written in 1925, cites John Brand in his Brief Description of Orkney (1700) as having much to say of the chapel:

People used to come to it from other isles; before the chapel door was a heap of small stones, "into which the Superstituous People when they come, do cast a small stone or two for their offering, and some will cast in Money"; the loch is "held by the People as Medicinal"; "a Gentleman in the Countrey, who was much distressed with sore Eyes, went to this Loch and Washing there became sound and whole...with both which persons he who was Minister of the place for many years was well acquainted and told us that he saw them both before and after the Cure: The present minister of Westra told me that such as are able to walk use to go so many times about the Loch, as they think will perfect the cure before they make any use of the water, and that without speaking to any... not long since, he went to this Loch and found six so making their circuit..." "As for this Loch's appearing like Blood, before any disaster befal the Royal Family, as some do report, we could find no ground to believe any such thing.

In the 19th century the Minister of Westray, John Armit, noted that:

Such was the veneration entertained by the inhabitants for this ancient saint, that it was with difficulty that the first Presbyterian minister of the parish could restrain them, of a Sunday morning, from paying their devotions at this ruin, previous to their attendance on public worship in the reformed church. Wonders, in the way of cure of bodily disease, are said to have been wrought by this saint, whose fame is now passed away and name almost forgotten.

== Dedication to St Triduana ==
Ss Ninian and Triduana’s Church, Edinburgh is a Roman Catholic church dedicated to St Triduana.
