= Lochend Park =

Park in Edinburgh, Scotland

- Edinburgh, Scotland; UK
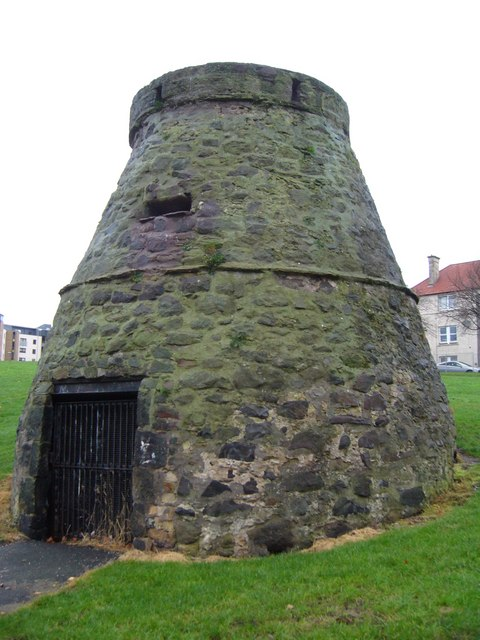
- Lochend Castle Doocot

Site information
- Type: Urban park
- Owner: Edinburgh Council
- Open to the public: Yes
- Status: Open all year

Location
- Location in Edinburgh
- Coordinates: 55.9606°N 3.1605°W

Lochend Park is a public park in Edinburgh, Scotland. It is situated in the Lochend / Restalrig area, next to Lochend Castle and near Meadowbank Stadium. The loch with its wide range of waterfowl is the main attraction, but there are also historical buildings, a children's play area, and sports areas. The park was awarded a Green Flag in 2012 in recognition of it being a quality greenspace. Within the park there is a 16th-century doocot which is Category B listed.

== History ==
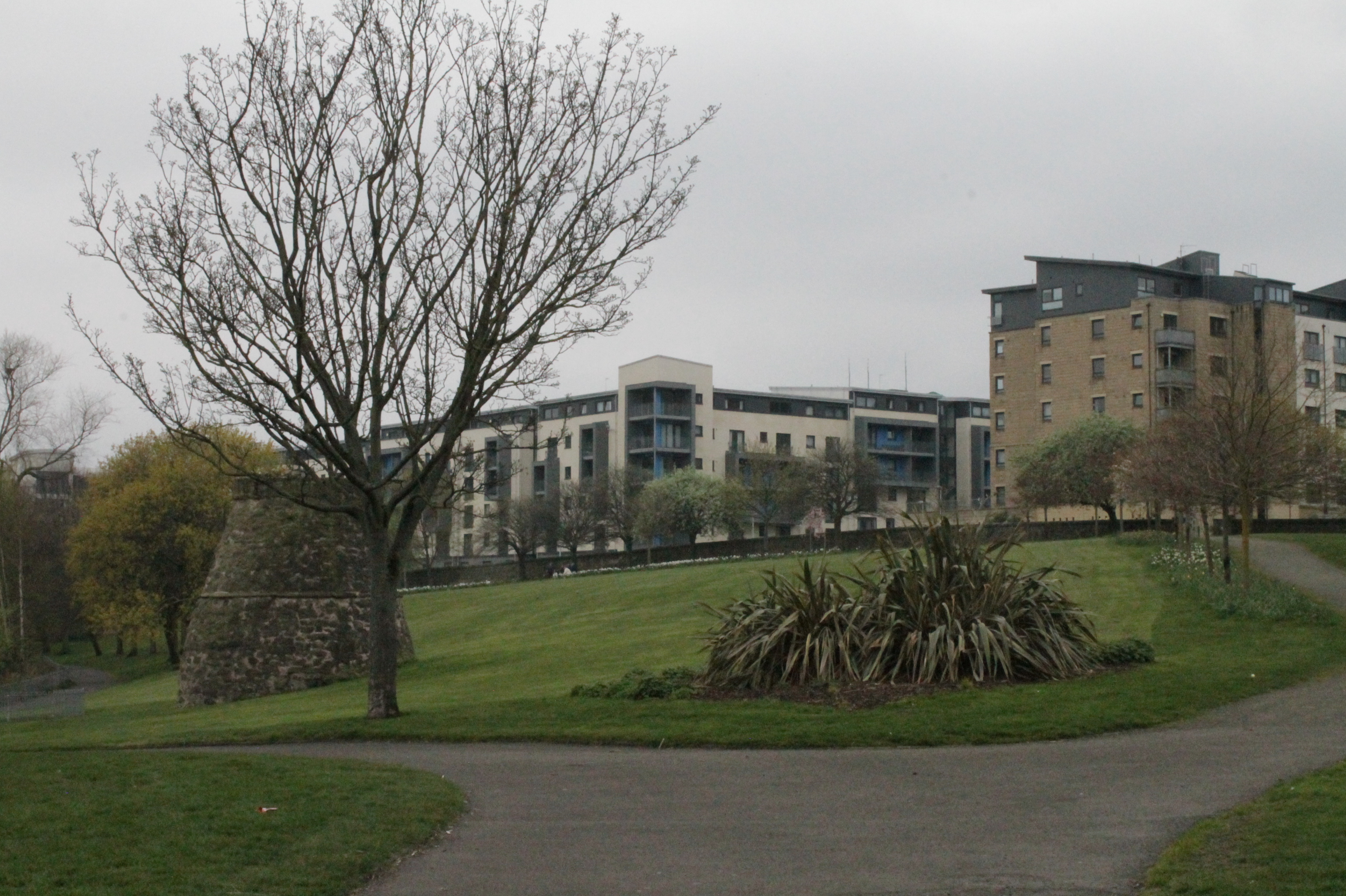
Modern flats overlooking Lochend Park

The park was originally the grounds of Lochend Castle, part of the feudal lands of Robert Logan of Restalrig. The original castle was replaced by Lochend House in 1810 and only the servants quarters and kitchen chimney remain from the original house.

The Doocot was built in the 16th century to supply pigeons to Lochend Castle. In 1564 it was used as a "plague kiln" to burn clothes and bedding of infected people during an outbreak of plague. In the 19th century it served as a boat house for the Royal Humane Society who were set up to save people from drowning. The boat was also used in winter to check if the ice on the loch was thick enough for games of curling.

Lochend Loch served as Leith's main water supply from around 1650. Originally gravity-fed, there is an early 18th century pump station, which facilitated the process, between the doocot and the loch. Leith shared Edinburgh's water supply from the mid-18th century and the final water supplies from the loch were sealed off around 1920.

Railway lines were built to west and south in the mid-19th century, isolating the park from the city. Although the railways were closed in the Beeching cuts of the 1950s it was only in the early 21st century that improved links were made on these sides, being required with the development of the new flats that now overlook the park.

== Wildlife ==
There are a range of habitats to be found in the park. The loch is home to a wide variety of wildfowl, including swans, geese, coots, moorhens, mallards and herons, as well as rats. A viewing platform and planting beds, funded by the City of Edinburgh Council and WREN, were created around the pond in the spring of 2011. The viewing platform gives people greater access to see the wildlife and allows local schools the chance to take part in pond dipping activities. The new planting, including yellow flag iris and water mint, will enhance the biodiversity of the pond by providing more habitats and food for the local wildlife.

== Friends of Lochend Park ==
The Friends of Lochend Park is a group of local volunteers who help to administer and improve the park resources. In 2014 they bought the old police telephone box at the north-east entrance to the park, to be refurbished as a store for visitor materials.
