= William Wood (Scottish surgeon) =

Scottish surgeon (1782–1858)

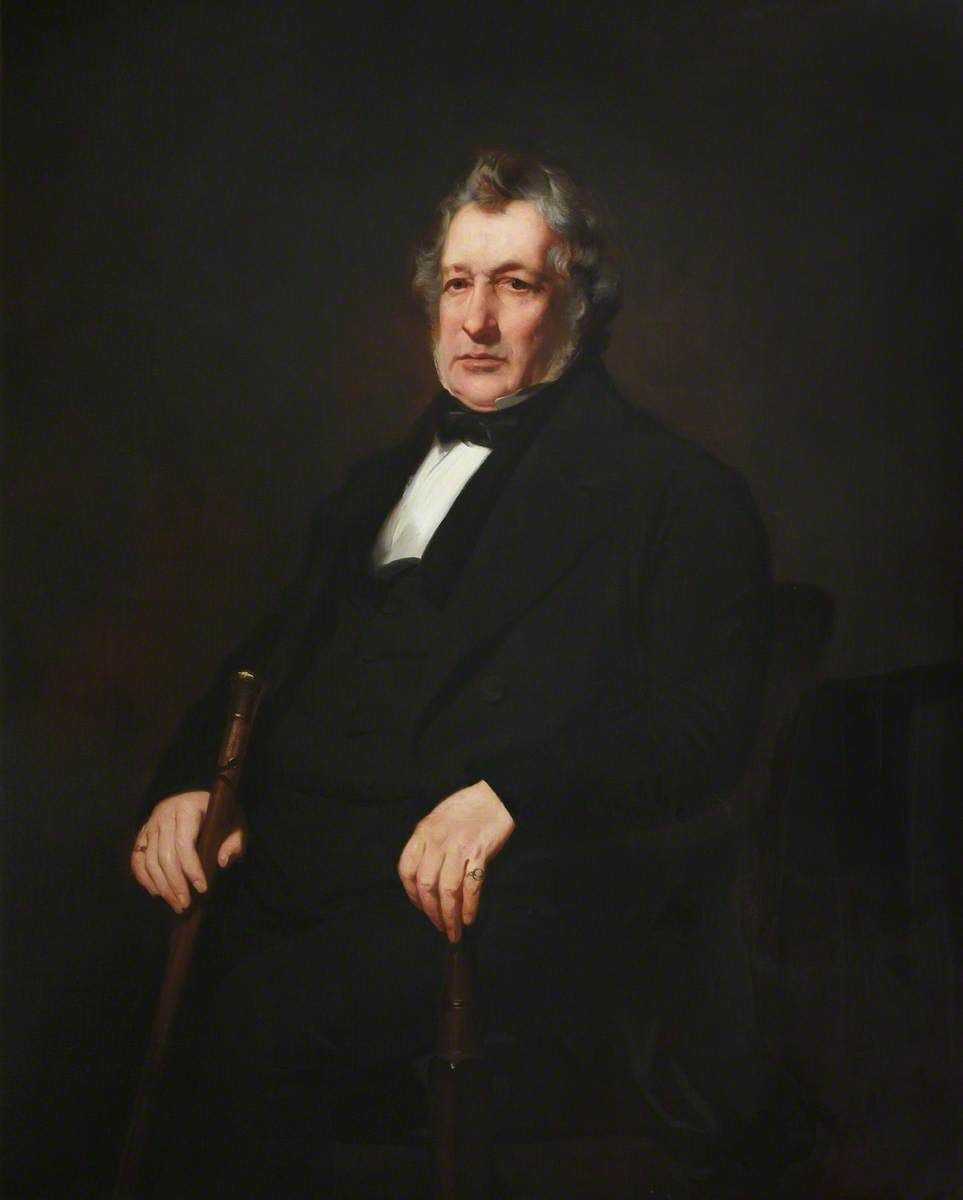
Painting of William Wood by John Watson Gordon

William Wood FRCSEd FRSE (13 September 1782–3 September 1858) was a 19th-century Scottish surgeon who twice served as President of the Royal College of Surgeons of Edinburgh, twice as President of the Medico-Chirurgical Society and once as President of the Harveian Society.

== Life ==
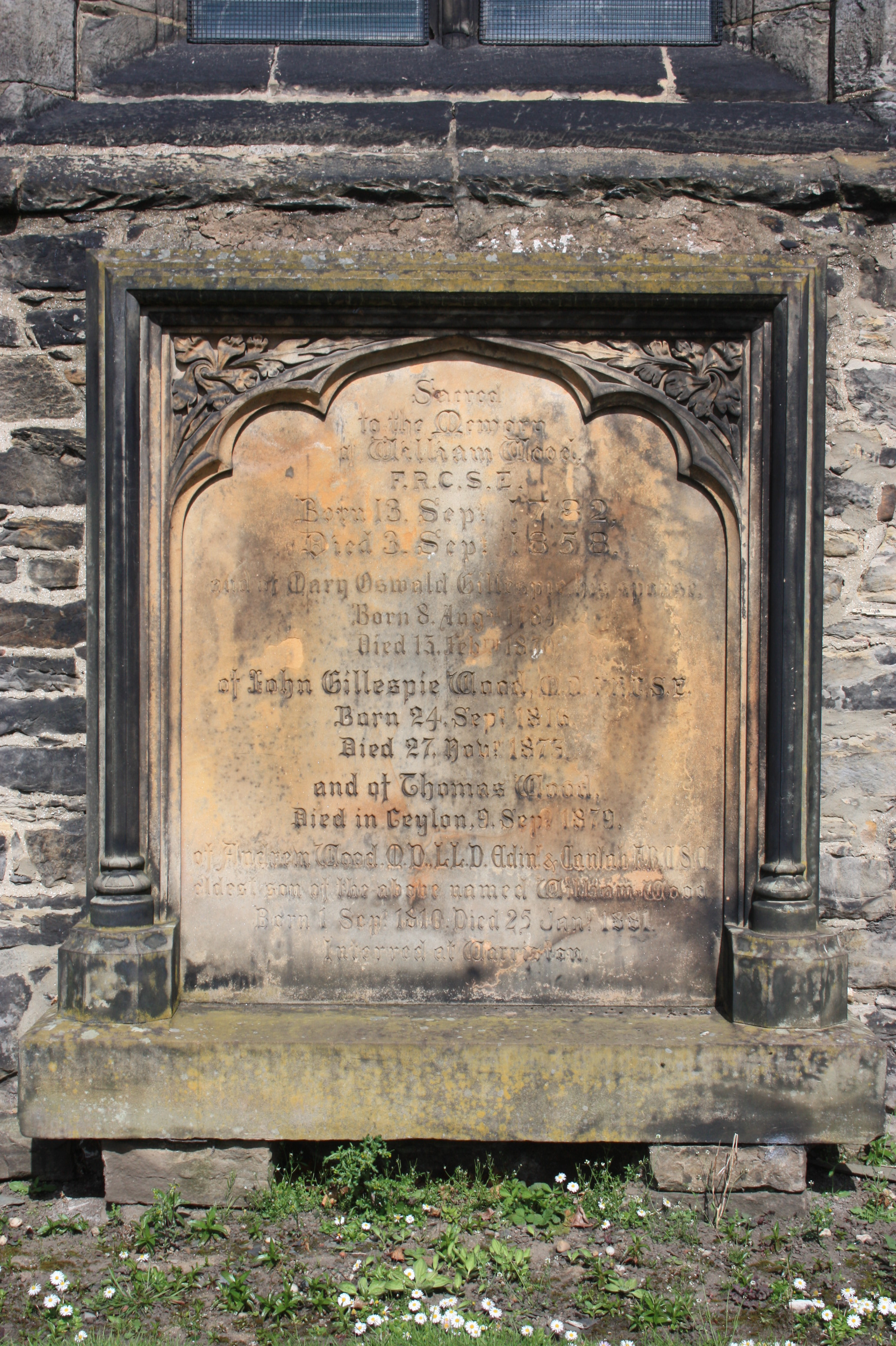
The grave of Dr William Wood, Restalrig Churchyard

He was born at Horse Wynd on the Royal Mile in Edinburgh on 13 September 1782, the son of Andrew Wood. He was educated at the High School in Edinburgh then studied medicine at the University of Edinburgh. He was licensed as a surgeon in 1805. He lived at 9 South Hanover Street and carried out his surgical practice from this address.

In 1816 Wood was elected a member of the Harveian Society of Edinburgh and served as president in 1821. In 1820 he was elected a member of the Aesculapian Club.

In 1822 he succeeded John Henry Wishart as President of the Royal College of Surgeons of Edinburgh. He served a second term from 1826 to 1828, being succeeded by John Gairdner.

In 1824 he elected a Fellow of the Royal Society of Edinburgh his proposer being Robert Graham.

In 1831 he was joined by his newly qualified son, Andrew, both practicing from premises at 87 George Street in Edinburgh's New Town close to their home at 42 South Hanover Street.

He was President of the Medico-Chirurgical Society 1837–1839.

He died at home, 24 Stafford Street in western Edinburgh on 3 September 1858. He is buried in Restalrig churchyard in eastern Edinburgh, beside Alexander Wood, Lord Wood, his uncle. The grave is on the south side of the church.

== Family ==
He married Mary Oswald Gillespie around 1805. Their sons included Dr John Gillespie Wood (1816-1875), Dr Andrew Wood and Thomas Wood (who died in Ceylon in 1879).
