= George Wilson (VC) =

Recipient of the Victoria Cross

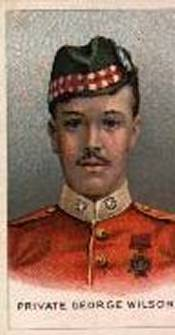
- Born: 29 April 1886; Edinburgh, Scotland
- Died: 22 April 1926 (aged 39); Craighleigh Hospital, Edinburgh
- Burial place: Piershill Cemetery
- Military career
- Allegiance: United Kingdom
- Branch: British Army
- Rank: Private
- Unit: Highland Light Infantry
- Conflicts: First World War
- Awards: Victoria Cross

George Wilson VC (29 April 1886 – 22 April 1926) was a Scottish recipient of the Victoria Cross, the highest and most prestigious award for gallantry in the face of the enemy that can be awarded to British and Commonwealth forces.

== Details ==
Wilson was 28 years old, and a private in the 2nd Battalion, The Highland Light Infantry, British Army during the First World War, during the First Battle of the Aisne, when the following deed took place for which he was awarded the VC.

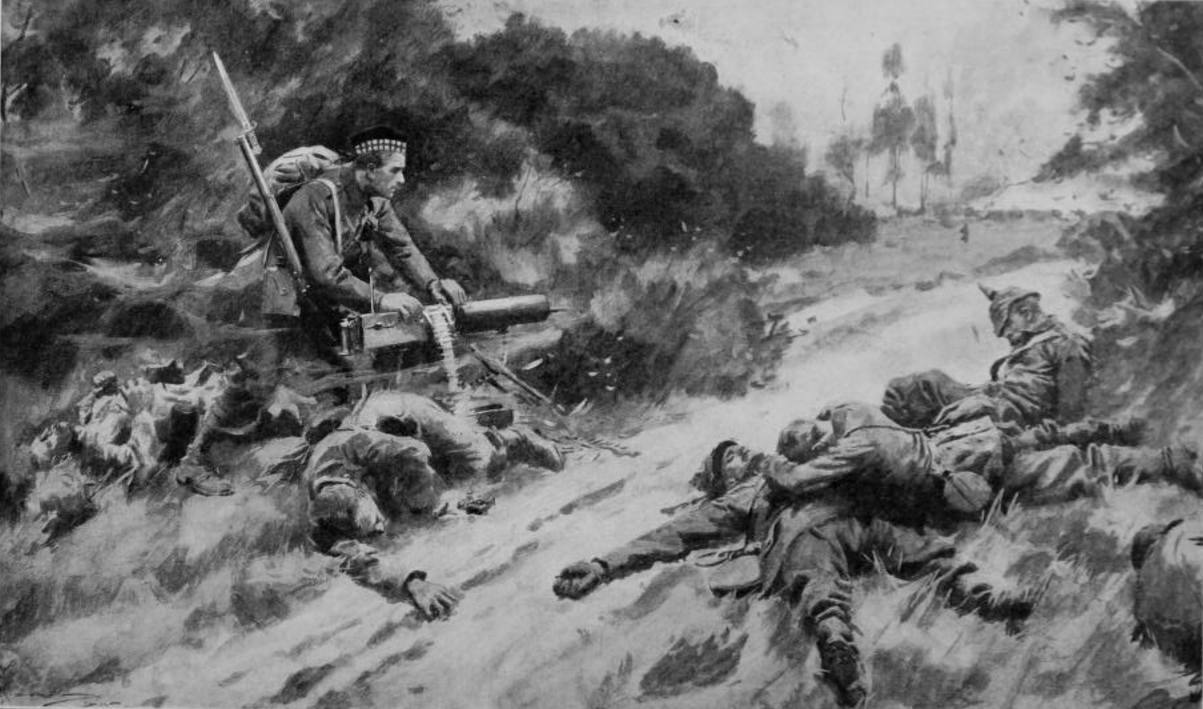
George Wilson captures the enemy machine gun (artist's reconstruction)

No. 9553 Private George Wilson, 2nd Battalion, The Highland Light Infantry. For most conspicuous gallantry on the 14th of September near Verneuil, in attacking a hostile Machine Gun, accompanied by only one man. When the latter was killed, he went on alone, shot the Officer and six Men working the Gun, which he captured.

== The medal ==
Wilson's Victoria Cross is displayed at the Museum of The Royal Highland Fusiliers, Glasgow, Scotland. He died of tuberculosis at Craigleith Hospital and is buried in Piershill Cemetery in Edinburgh.
