= Sigmund Neuberger =

German-American illusionist

- Born: 25 February 1871; Munich, Germany
- Died: 9 May 1911 (aged 40); Edinburgh, Scotland
- Cause of death: Theatre fire
- Resting place: Piershill Cemetery, Edinburgh
- Other names: The Great Lafayette
- Occupation: Illusionist
- Years active: 1890–1911

Sigmund Neuberger (or Sigmund Newburger) (25 February 1871 – 9 May 1911), was an illusionist who performed under the stage name the Great Lafayette, and he was reportedly the highest-paid magician of his time.

== Early life and career ==
Neuberger was born in Munich, and emigrated to the United States in 1884. At the age of 19, he began performing in vaudeville-style entertainment, and later began his career as a conjuror as an impersonator of the magician Ching Ling Foo. He adopted the name "the Great Lafayette", and made his first appearance in England in 1892.

His excellent quick-change routines, as well as dramatic illusions, such as his own "Lion's Bride" and "Dr. Kremser–Vivisectionist" illusions, made him very popular with audiences. He became one of the highest-paid performers in vaudeville, earning £44,000 a year (about £3.6 million in 2014 prices). By 1900, he was able to tour with a company of 40 performers, together with his magic show and a menagerie including a lion, for use in his illusions.

== Death of Beauty ==
Early in 1911, Neuberger began a tour of Britain. The pampered object of the Great Lafayette's affection was his dog Beauty, a mongrel given to him as a puppy by fellow conjurer and admirer Harry Houdini. Beauty had her own suite of rooms, ate five-course meals, and wore a diamond-studded collar. Shortly after Neuberger's arrival in Britain, Beauty fell ill. Despite Neuberger paying for doctors and nurses to try and treat her, Beauty died on May 5th, just days before the opening of a show at the Empire Palace Theatre in Edinburgh. After initial resistance from Edinburgh City Council, Neuberger arranged for the dog to be buried in Piershill Cemetery. The Council agreed to provide a plot on the condition that Lafayette himself would be buried there upon his own death.

== Theatre fire ==
Four days after the death of Beauty, Lafayette was performing his signature illusion "The Lion's Bride", when a lantern set fire to the set, which went up in flames within minutes. The audience, thinking that this was all part of the illusion, did not evacuate until the theatre manager signalled for the orchestra to play God Save the King. Many of the company, however, were trapped on stage when the safety curtain was lowered and jammed, leaving only a small gap at the bottom, through which a strong draught of air fanned the flames into an inferno. Lafayette himself had ensured that the side-doors to the stage had been secured, to exclude unwanted interlopers and prevent the lion's escape.

Lafayette escaped but returned in a vain attempt to rescue his horse. He became trapped in the burning building and perished. Ten of his fellow players from the company were also killed in the fire, as were both of the animals. The body of Lafayette was apparently soon found and sent to Glasgow for cremation. Two days after the fire, however, workers clearing the understage area found another body identically dressed as Lafayette. It transpired that the body at the crematorium was that of the illusionist's body double. On 14 May 1911 the urn containing the Great Lafayette's ashes was taken through Edinburgh, witnessed by a crowd estimated to number over 250,000, before being laid to rest with his beloved (and by then, stuffed) Beauty, at Piershill Cemetery.

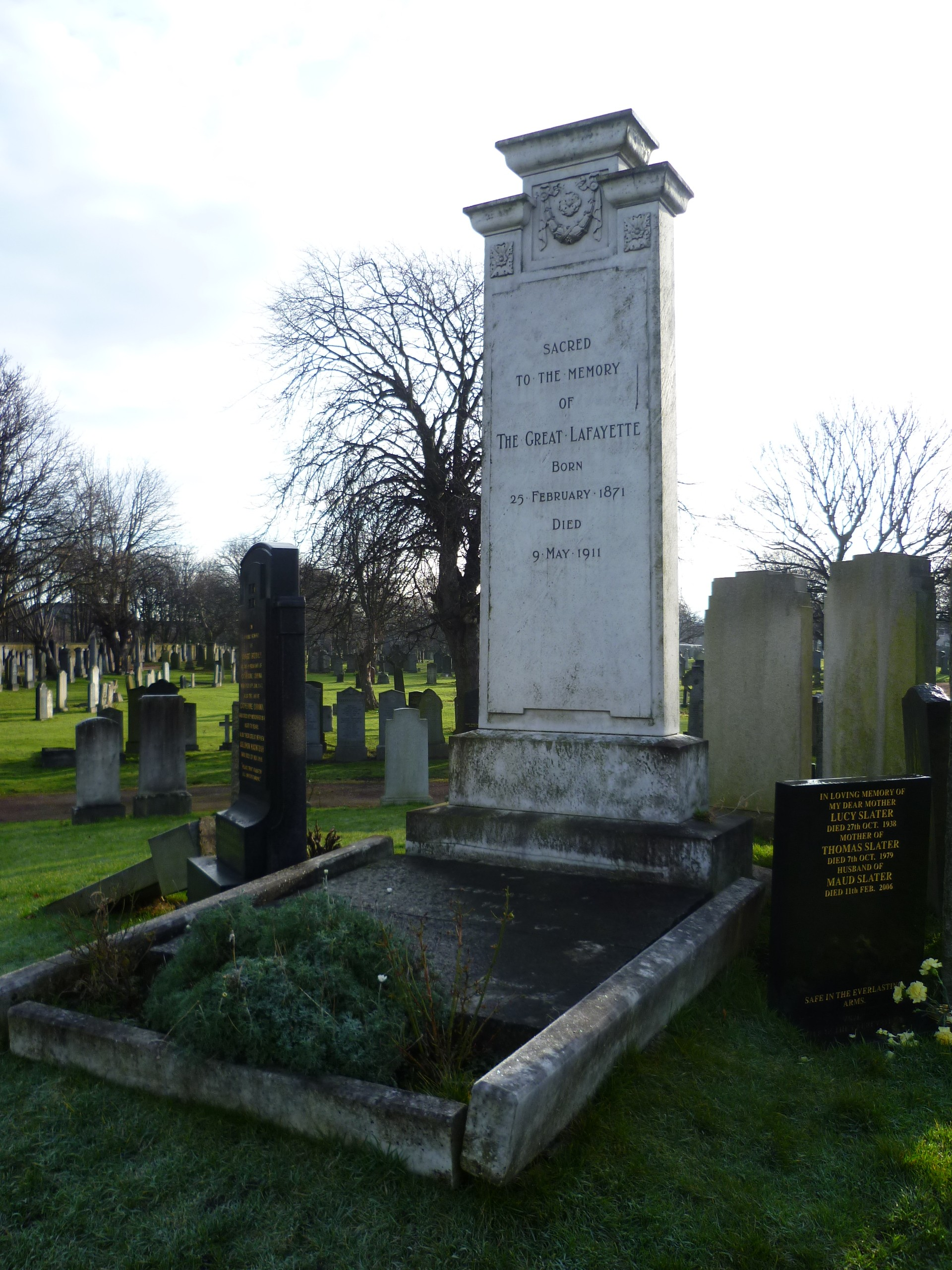
Grave of the Great Lafayette, Piershill Cemetery, Edinburgh

== Legacy ==
In May 2011 the Edinburgh Festival Theatre, the current name of the renamed and substantially rebuilt Empire Palace, hosted the "Great Lafayette Festival", featuring magician Paul Daniels, to commemorate the hundredth anniversary of Neuberger's death. The event included, on 9 May, a live webcast séance held by the "Edinburgh Secret Society", led by co-founders Professor Richard Wiseman and Dr. Peter Lamont.
