= Katherine Ramsay =

- Born: 1720s
- Died: 28 January 1808; Edinburgh
- Occupations: Milliner and haberdasher

Katherine Ramsay (1720s – 28 January 1808) was a milliner and haberdasher. Records exist of her business in Edinburgh off what is now the Royal Mile.

== Life ==
Ramsay was born in the 1720s and she had five sisters Mary, Christian, Ann and Jean who were all involved in making and selling hats and haberdashery. Their parents were Katherine (born Kerr) and Gilbert Ramsay. Gilbert was a solicitor who was a factor managing the estate of John Ker, 1st Duke of Roxburghe. She and her younger sister were successful shopkeepers. They had a five room shop on Lyon Close accessible from Edinburgh High Street which is now part of the Royal Mile. They had assistants and servants including a clerk named James Mushet and Isobel Colvin who worked with them for a decade. They frequently appear in court records where they are suing for payment. Katherine and her staff appear as witnesses as their debtors are tried.

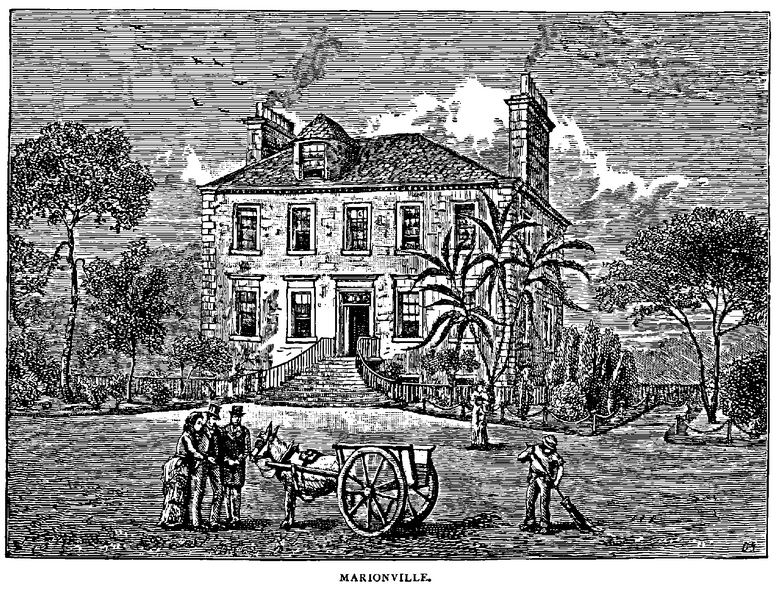
Viewfirth (later renamed Marionville House)

Goods were sold and manufactured at their premises which was offered for sale on 20 December 1765.

She and Ann bought land called "Kilnacre" at Restalrig near Edinburgh. The land was purchased from their sister Christian's husband, James who was a builder. They had a house built on the land starting in 1769. This house was called Viewfrith or Viewfirth. They sold it in 1783 to Capt. James M'Rae or McRae cousin of the Earl of Glencairn who called it Marionville. It is unclear where she then worked but she was still in business in 1771 when she and her sister were selling goods to "Clerk of Penicuik".

== Death and legacy ==
Ramsay died in Edinburgh in 1808 probably at her home in Antigua Street. She left her bible and prayerbook to her niece and she died owning £4,000 worth (equivalent to over £500,000 in 2022) of shares in the Bank of Scotland.
