= St Mary's Cathedral, Edinburgh (Catholic) =

Cathedral in Edinburgh, Scotland

Coordinates: 55.9561°N 3.1877°W

St Mary's Metropolitan Cathedral
- Metropolitan Cathedral of Our Lady of the Assumption
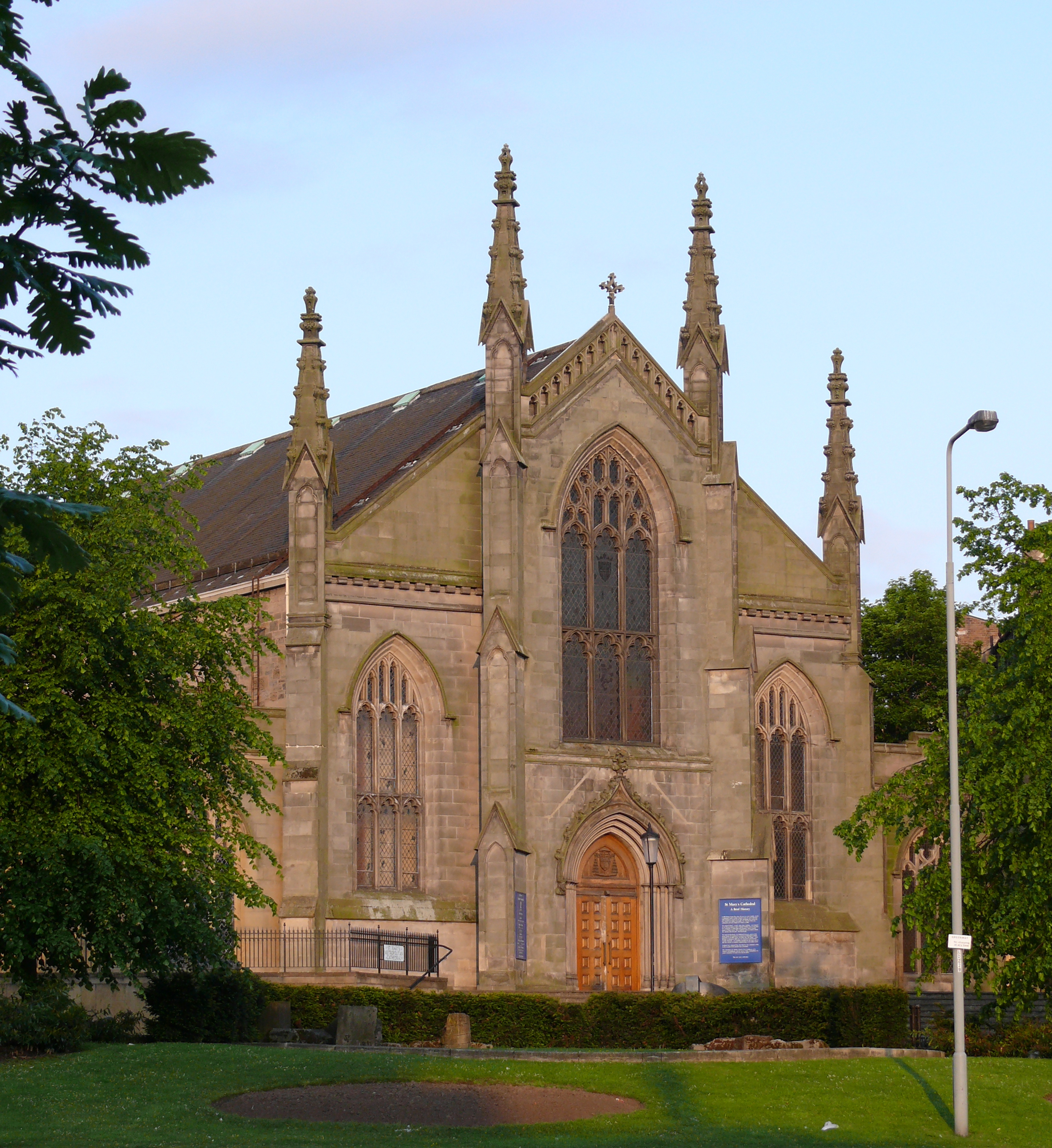

- Shown within Edinburgh
- Location: Edinburgh
- Country: Scotland
- Denomination: Roman Catholic
- Website: stmaryscathedral.co.uk

History
- Former name: Chapel of St Mary's (1814)
- Status: Metropolitan Cathedral (of the Province of St Andrews and Edinburgh)
- Dedication: Our Lady of the Assumption
- Consecrated: 1814

Architecture
- Heritage designation: Listed B
- Architect: James Gillespie Graham
- Style: Neo-Gothic
- Completed: 1814

Administration
- Province: St Andrews and Edinburgh
- Archdiocese: St Andrews and Edinburgh

Clergy
- Archbishop: Leo Cushley

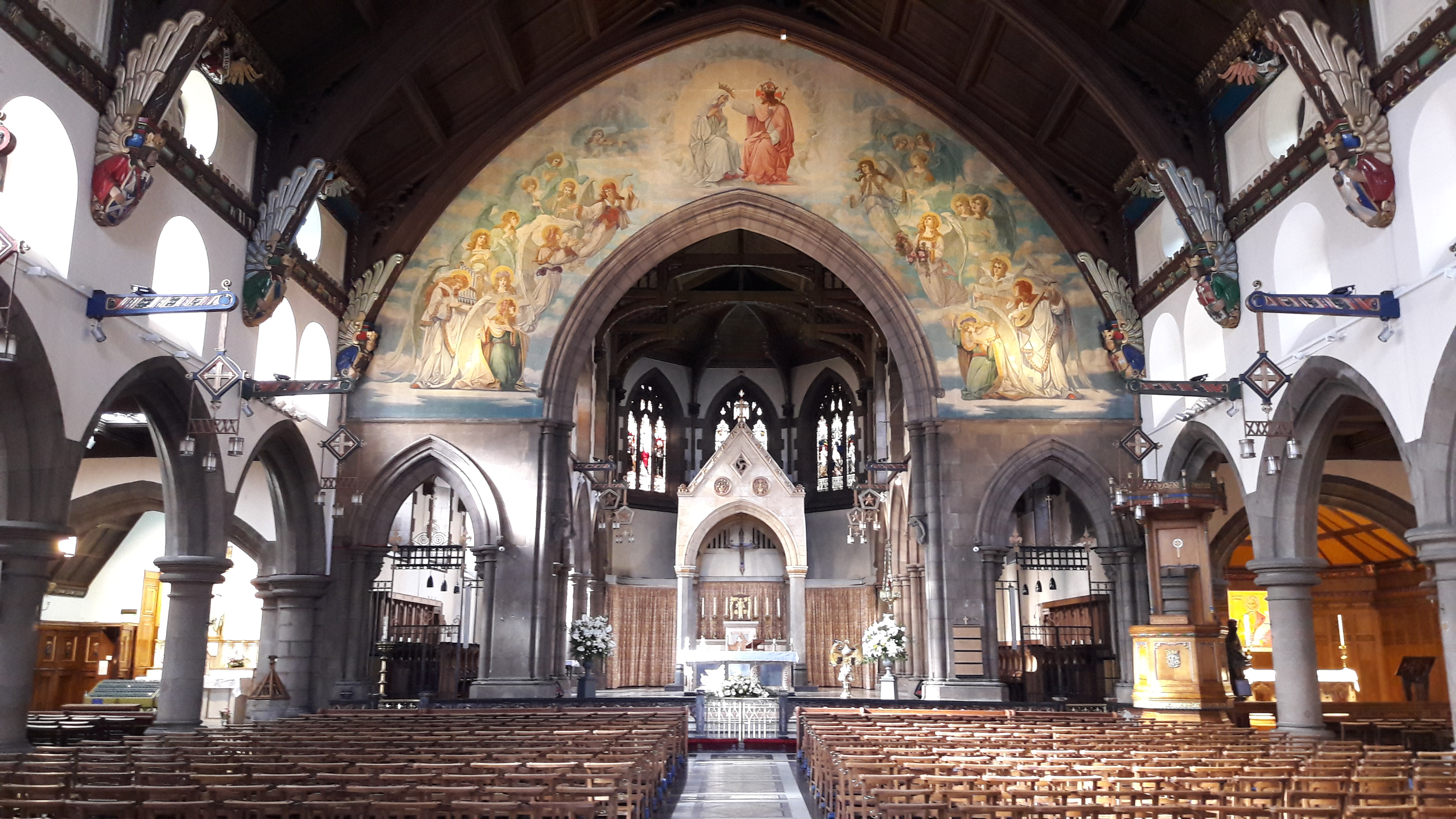
Interior view

The Metropolitan Cathedral of Our Lady of the Assumption, also known as St Mary's Metropolitan Cathedral, is a Roman Catholic church in Edinburgh, Scotland. It is the seat of the Archbishop of Saint Andrews and Edinburgh and is the mother church of the Archdiocese of St Andrews and Edinburgh. The cathedral is located in the section of Broughton Street between York Place and Leith Street in the East End of the New Town in the city centre. It is a category B listed building.

== History ==
The Chapel of St Mary's was opened in 1814 and was originally designed by James Gillespie Graham. It was built in replacement of the Chapel of St Andrew the Apostle on Blackfriars Wynd (which had been tolerated despite Scotland not recognising the Catholic faith). The construction of a purpose-built church recognised a broad acceptance of the faith by 1814.

The church was considerably embellished over the years, and in 1878 (upon the restoration of the Scottish hierarchy), it became the pro-cathedral of the new Archdiocese of St Andrews and Edinburgh. It was renamed the Metropolitan Cathedral on 5 July 1886, with all the rights and privileges appertaining to such a church. It contains the National Shrine of Saint Andrew.

It was made a category B listed building in 1970.

Pope John Paul II visited St Mary's in May 1982, as part of his pastoral visit to Scotland.

== Architecture ==
The building was designed in 1813–14 in the neo-perpendicular style by James Gillespie Graham, with additional designs by Augustus Pugin.

In 1892 a fire at the neighbouring Theatre Royal required changes to the cathedral. Arches were made in the side walls and aisles were added on both sides, designed by John Biggar. The sanctuary was extended backwards by three bays of arches.

The war memorial and high altar were added in 1921, designed by Reginald Fairlie. A baldachino was added in 1927. In 1932 the height of the roof was increased by Reid and Forbes.

In the 1970s the front of the cathedral was opened up due to the demolition of tenement buildings. The porch and baptistery were replaced by a larger porch, designed by T. Harley Haddow, and the sanctuary was remodelled to meet the requirements of the Second Vatican Council.

== Music ==
The Schola Cantorum has eight singers and sings a wide range of sacred music including plainchant, renaissance polyphony and modern compositions. In addition, there is a mixed-ability cathedral choir.

A new organ was installed in 2008, built by Matthew Copley and having 4,000 pipes.

The Director of Music is Michael Ferguson, who also teaches at the University of St Andrews and is a composer.

Concerts and recitals were held in the cathedral during the Edinburgh Festival Fringe from 2009 to 2016.

== Current clergy ==
- Fr Jeremy Milne, VG (administrator), Fr Robert Taylor
- Fr Tadeusz Puton SAC (non-resident), Chaplain of the Polish Mission

== Parish organisation ==
From 2017 the many parishes in Edinburgh have been organised into clusters to better coordinate their resources. St Mary's Cathedral is one of four parishes in Cluster 1 along with St Ninian and Triduana, St Patrick and St Albert.

== Cafe Camino ==
The cathedral formerly operated a café in an adjoining building. It was used as a venue as part of the Free Fringe at the Edinburgh Festival Fringe.

== Administrators ==
- Mgr. William Smith (1878–85)
- Canon James Donlevy (1885–1903)
- Mgr. Alexander Stuart (1903–23)
- Canon Patrick McGettigan (1923–47)
- Mgr. John Breen (1947–56)
- Mgr. Patrick Quille (1956–82)
- Mgr. Patrick J. Grady (1982–?)
- Mgr. David Gemmell (?–2008)
- Mgr. Michael B. Regan (?–2015)
- Mgr. Patrick Burke (2015–24)
- Mgr. Jeremy Milne (2024–present)

== See also ==
- List of cathedrals in the United Kingdom
- St Mary's Cathedral, Edinburgh (Episcopal)
