= Lochend House =

House in Edinburgh, Scotland

Lochend Castle
- Edinburgh, Scotland
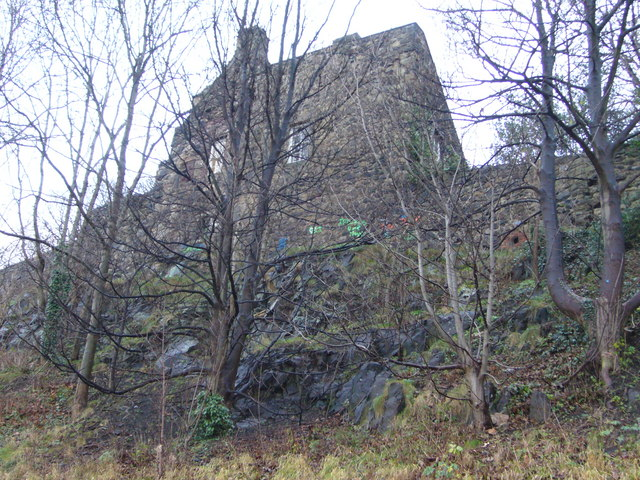
- Lochend House

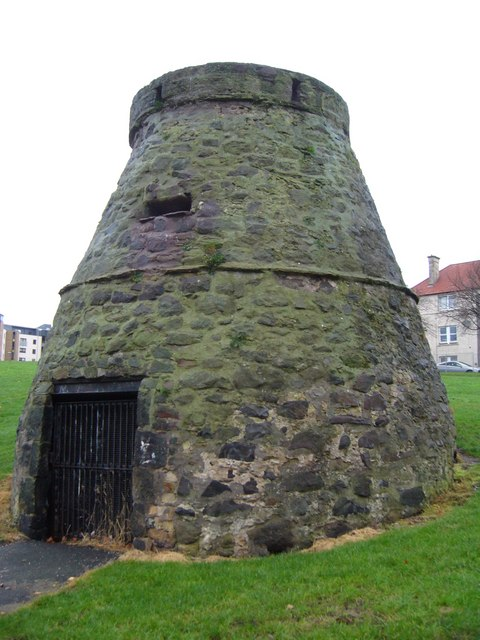
- Lochend Castle Doocot

Site information
- Type: L-Plan Tower House
- Owner: Edinburgh Council
- Controlled by: Lestalric Family (until 14th Century) Logan Family (until c.1600)
- Open to the public: No

Location
- Location in Scotland
- Coordinates: 55.9603°N 3.159°W

Site history
- Built: c.16th Century

Lochend House, also known as Restalrig Castle and Lochend Castle, is an occupied house, incorporating the remains of a 16th-century L-plan tower house, in Edinburgh, Scotland. It is located in the Lochend area, about 1.5 miles (2.4 km) east of Edinburgh Castle. The house is protected as a category B listed building.

== History ==
The original castle was built on lands originally belonging to the Lestalric family, but which had passed to the Logan family of Restalrig early in the 14th century. That family retained possession until forfeited for their part in the Gowrie conspiracy against King James VI. The castle was burned by William Gilmour of the Inch at that time. Sir Robert Logan was the last member of the family to own the property.

Thereafter the property was in the hands of Arthur Elphinstone, 6th Lord Balmerino, from 1704. He was executed in London for his part in the Jacobite rising of 1745, having been captured after the battle of Culloden.

The gable end of the tower is incorporated into the present house, which was built around 1820. The building was owned by the City of Edinburgh Council and it was used as a children's centre until 2016 when a fire burned out the roof. Following the rebuilding of the roof, the property was put on the market for sale by Edinburgh Council in 2017 listed as a "Residential development opportunity". It was sold in 2018 and is now in private ownership.

== Structure ==
The house is located on a crag in Lochend Park, with steep slopes down to a small loch on its west side. The original part of the building comprises a three-storey L-plan block, which has a steeply pitched roof. The interior has been completely altered, but there are still some aumbries in the thick walls, and there are remnants of a fireplace large enough for an ox to be roasted in it. Nearby within the park is a 16th-century doocot, which was used in the 19th century as a boat house, and is now also Category B listed.

== Lochend Loch ==
Lochend House sits atop a 10-metre rock escarpment. At the bottom of this lies Lochend Loch. This loch forms a natural hollow in the local topography, and with no outlet, is effectively a large puddle, whose depth varies according to rainfall. For at least part of its history, the loch served as a water supply to Leith to the north-west. However, even by olden standards the quality of the water was poor, being largely stagnant, and Leith people preferred to use local wells instead.

James IV of Scotland came to the Lochend to hunt wildfowl in September 1507, and four men were paid to row a boat on the "loch of Restalrig" to start the birds.
