= Piershill Barracks =

- Piershill, Edinburgh, Scotland
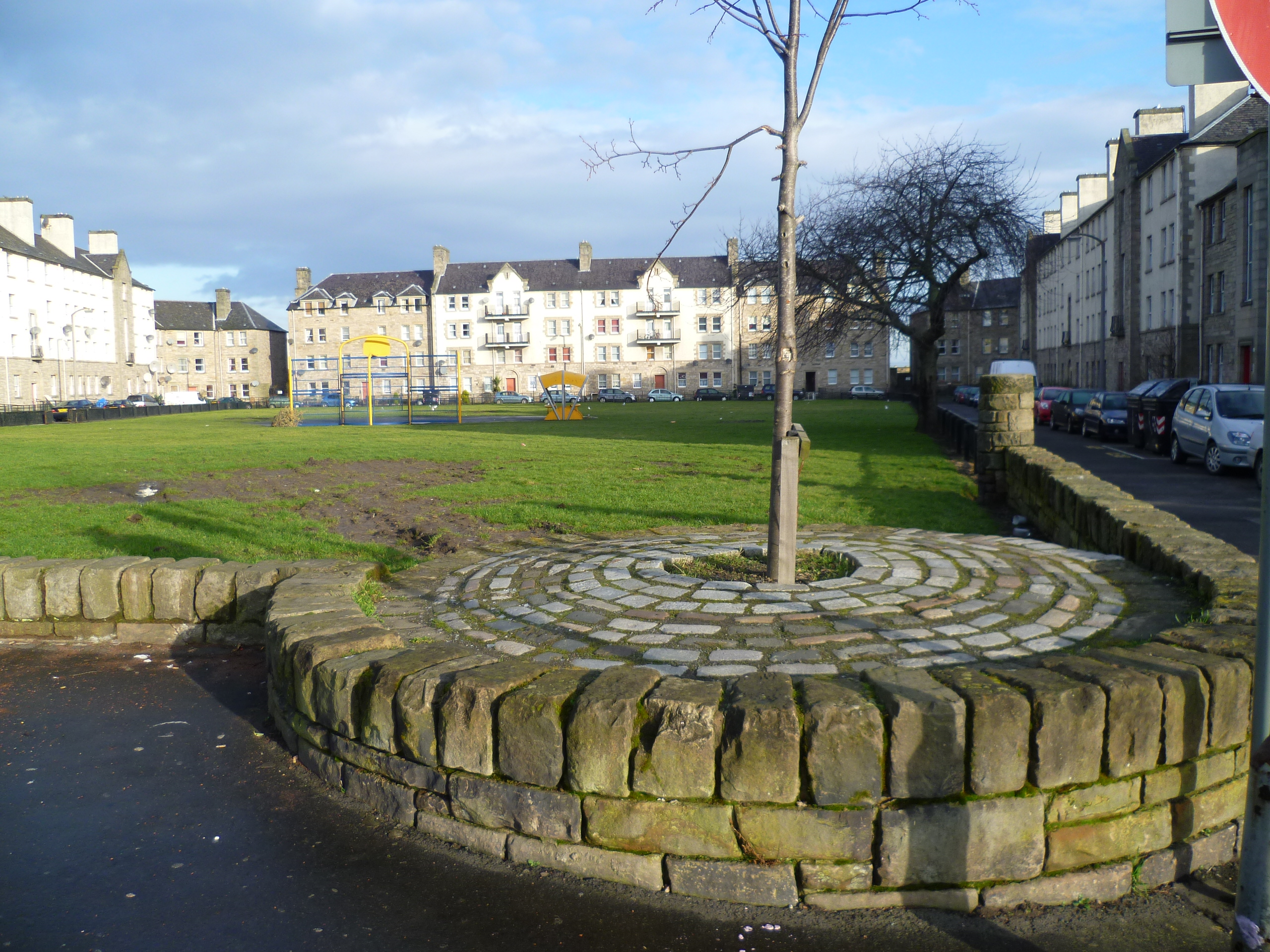
- Remains of a wall tower of Piershill Barracks

Location
- Location within Edinburgh
- Location within the City of Edinburgh council area
- Coordinates: 55.956°N 3.146°W

Site history
- Built: 1793
- Built for: War Office
- In use: 1793-1934

Piershill Barracks was a military installation in Piershill in Edinburgh, Scotland.

== History ==
The barracks were built as part of the British response to the threat of the French Revolution and were completed in 1793. Built along three sides of a quadrangle, they were occupied by various cavalry regiments who would exercise their horses along Portobello Beach. Regiments there were the Dragoon Guards, Light Dragoons, 9th Lancers, Inniskilling Dragoons, 7th Hussars and the Royal Scots Greys.

A General Court Martial was convened at the barracks on 25 September 1820 by order of Major-General Sir Thomas Bradford, Commander in Chief, Scotland, to try all such prisoners brought before it, with Colonel Sir William Williams K.C.B. (later Major-General William Williams (1776–1832)) as presiding officer.

They became the home of the Royal Scots Greys in the late 19th century but were condemned as insanitary and unfit for occupation by cavalry regiments in the early 20th century; this gave rise to concerns that the Royal Scots Greys would be disbanded leaving Scotland without a cavalry regiment. In practice the Royal Scots Greys moved to Redford Barracks and Piershill Barracks continued to be used on a much smaller scale by the Royal Horse Artillery.

The barracks were vacated in 1934 and demolished by 1938, shortly before the start of the Second World War. The site is now occupied by the Piershill Square tenement blocks which were constructed in 1937–1938 using stone from the old barracks. The blocks were created as Council housing by the City Architect, Ebenezer James MacRae.
