= Restalrig =

Suburb of Edinburgh, Scotland

Coordinates: 55°57′35″N 3°09′02″W

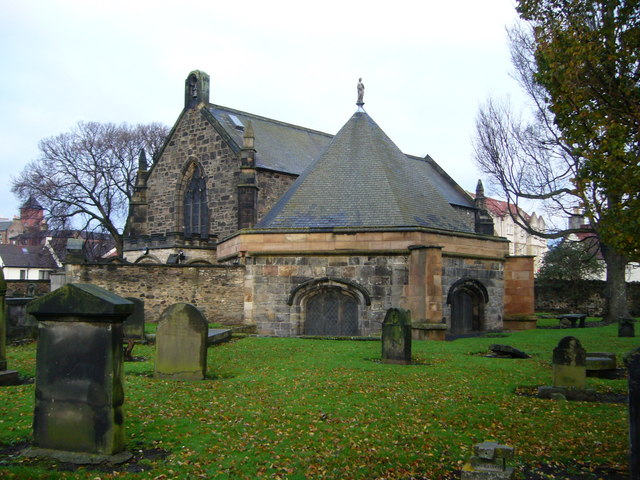
- Restalrig Church with St. Triduana's Chapel in the foreground

- Location within the City of Edinburgh council area Location within Scotland
- OS grid reference: NT285749
- Council area: City of Edinburgh
- Lieutenancy area: Edinburgh
- Country: Scotland
- Sovereign state: United Kingdom
- Post town: EDINBURGH
- Postcode district: EH7
- Dialling code: 0131
- Police: Scotland
- Fire: Scottish
- Ambulance: Scottish
- UK Parliament: Edinburgh East
- Scottish Parliament: Edinburgh Eastern

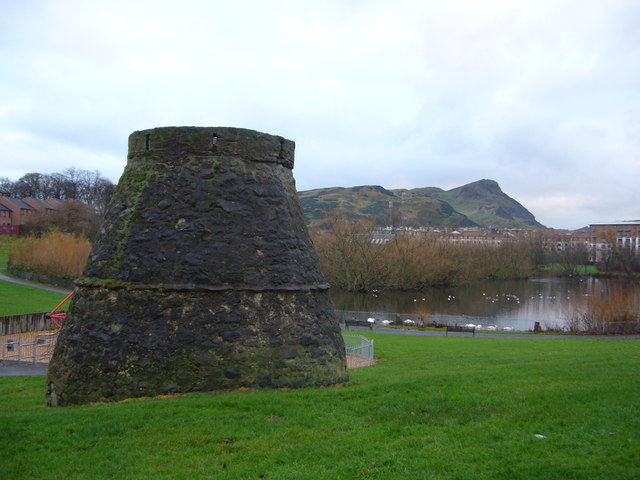
Lochend Park with Lochend Castle doocot

Restalrig (/ˈrɛslrɪɡ/ RESL-rig) is a small residential suburb of Edinburgh, Scotland (historically, an estate and independent parish). It is located east of the city centre, west of Craigentinny and to the east of Lochend, both of which it overlaps. Restalrig Road is the main route through the area, running from London Road, at Jock's Lodge, to Leith Links.

== History and buildings ==
The place name Restalrig means "ridge of the miry land" (from lestal, a northern dialect term meaning "mire", and rig, the northern form of "ridge"). It is first mentioned as Lestalric in 1165, when Edward de Lestalric built a church on the site. The church was completed in 1210 by his grandson, Sir Thomas de Lestalric. The area, over the following centuries, is variously named as Lestalryk, Restalric or Rastalrig. The Norman noble family the de Lestalrics were the ancient landowners in the area (including nearby South Leith). Sir John de Lestalric died in 1382, leaving his estate to his daughter Katharine and her husband, Sir Robert Logan, who became the laird.

The castle of the Logan family stood on the site of Lochend House, overlooking Lochend Loch. The castle was largely destroyed by fire in the late 16th century. The present house on the site incorporates fragments of the pre-existing tower house. Visually it is now dominated by an 1820 villa built on the foundations of the older buildings. It is now owned by the City of Edinburgh Council, and is a category B listed building.

Lochend Loch below it was for many centuries the main water supply for Leith. The park which occupies the site of the now much reduced loch contains a 16th-century doocot at its northern end, sometimes speculated to have served as a kiln for burning infected clothing and belongings during the plague of 1645. It was later used as a boat house, and is now also category B listed.

According to Raphael Holinshed, Richard III of England camped at Restalrig in August 1482 after capturing Berwick upon Tweed. James IV of Scotland was a frequent visitor, giving offerings for masses before the altars of Our Lady and Saint Triduana and for keeping Our Lady's Light in September 1496, while his gunners assembled the royal artillery nearby for his mission to England with the pretender Perkin Warbeck.

During the Siege of Leith in Spring 1560, the headquarters of the English army was located at Restalrig Deanery near the kirk. In April 1572 at the height of the Marian civil war, Thomas Randolph and Sir William Drury stayed in the Deanery. Sir William Kirkcaldy of Grange decorated the house with the royal tapestry from Edinburgh Castle. The English ambassadors plotted with Archibald Douglas to kidnap George, Lord Seton from the shore of Leith, but the plan did not take effect.

Around 1604, the Logans sold Calton and Restalrig, otherwise known as Wester and Easter Restalrig, to Lord Balmerino and the Craigentinny part of the estate to Edinburgh merchant James Nisbet. Parts of Restalrig were forfeited by John Hay of Restalrig in 1746 after he was attainted during the Jacobite rising of 1745.

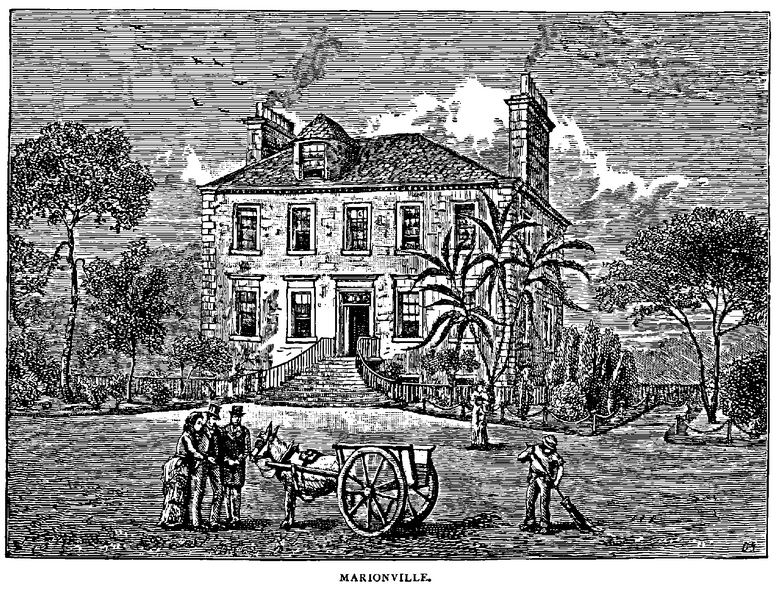
Marionville House

The most impressive remaining villa in the area is Marionville House, slightly west of the village centre. This was called Viewfrith when it was built by Ann and Katherine Ramsay starting in 1769. They sold it in 1783 to Capt. James M'Rae or McRae cousin of the Earl of Glencairn who called it Marionville. Other owners were Capt. Thomas Grindlay master of Trinity House of Leith, Robert Dudgeon founder of the Royal Insurance Company, and his son Patrick Dudgeon FRSE was born and raised here.

By 1857, Restalrig had become what the ordnance gazetteer of Scotland called "a decayed village". The area was mostly farmland and dairies. Around 1925, public housing was built to the north and east. Restalrig House whose entrance was at Restalrig Drive/Restalrig Road South was demolished in 1963.

St Margaret's Well stood here until 1859 when it was moved to Holyrood Park by the Society of Antiquaries of Scotland to avoid destruction by railway workshop construction.

Piershill Square at the head of Smokey Brae was built by the City Architect, Ebenezer James MacRae in 1937. It replaced Piershill Barracks, the former home of the Royal Scots Greys, the cavalry regiment most famous for their charge at Waterloo, and the subject of the well-known, and much reproduced, head-on view painted by Elizabeth Thompson, "Scotland Forever!". The parish church at Waterloo contains several monuments specifically to various soldiers "of Restalrig".

Within Restalrig are two multi-storey flats, Nisbet Court and Hawkhill Court. Both are owned by City of Edinburgh Council.

In 1784, the first British manned hot air balloon landed in Restalrig after taking off from nearby Abbeyhill.

== Restalrig Church ==
There has been a church at Restalrig as far back as 1178 and originally its parish incorporated South Leith. In 1296, Adam of St. Edmunds, the pastor of 'Restalric', swore fealty to English king Edward I.

It is not known whether the church was built because of St. Triduana, but the church, a rectangular building, housed her relics, and her cult prospered under the patronage of James III of Scotland. He built a hexagonal chapel royal there, adjacent to the kirk, dedicated to the Virgin Mary and the Holy Trinity, and endowed it a chaplaincy in 1477. It became known as the King's Chapel. Payment for the roof was made in 1486-7. At the same time, he made the kirk a collegiate establishment called the Deanery of Restalrig, and initiated a programme of extension. Originally built on two levels, the surviving lower level of the hexagon was an undercroft for the chapel above. Sometimes referred to as a "well-house", this is probably a misnomer, the flooding being accidental. The lower aisle was used as a burial chamber for the Logan family. James IV added six prebendaries and James V a choir of boys.

The kirk was ordered to be removed in December 1560 at the time of the Scottish Reformation. Some parts of the choir walls survived, however, and in 1836 were incorporated in the rebuilt church by William Burn which served as a chapel of ease for the parish of South Leith. Restalrig was disjoined as a quoad sacra parish from South Leith in 1912.

The church is a category A listed building. St. Triduana's Aisle is further protected as a Scheduled Ancient Monument.

Ss Ninian and Triduana’s Church, Edinburgh is a Catholic church in Restalrig dedicated to St. Triduana. The church on Marionville Road was designed in 1929 by Giles Gilbert Scott.

=== Notable interments in graveyard ===
- Robert Hodshon Cay (1758-1810) and his wife Elizabeth Liddell (1770-1831)
- Henry Brougham of Brougham Hall FRSE (1742-1810)
- Louis Cauvin (1754-1825), philanthropist
- Rev John Barclay (1758-1826), anatomist
- Lt General John Gordon (1764-1832)
- Michael Malcolm, 3rd Baronet (d.1793)
- Thomas Murray (1792-1872), author
- Robert Ord MP (1700-1778)
- Rev Dr Roderick J. J. MacDonald (1859-1906) missionary killed by Chinese pirates
- Henry Prentice (1703-1788) horticulturalist who first grew potatoes in Lothian
- Lt Col William Rickson (d.1770) comrade of General Wolfe
- Bishop Alexander Rose (1647-1720)
- The Rt Rev Michael Russell (1782-1848), Bishop of Glasgow and Galloway
- William Smellie (1810-1852) Advocate General of South Australia
- James Veitch, Lord Elliock (1712-1793)
- Margaret Wemyss, Countess of North Esk (d.1763)
- Alexander Wood (surgeon) (1725-1807) President of the Royal College of Surgeons of Edinburgh 1762-1764 (grave location unclear but presumably grouped with his family), and a descendant of his:
- Alexander Wood, Lord Wood (1788-1865) Senator of the College of Justice
- William Wood (Scottish surgeon) (1782-1858), 1st cousin once removed of Alexander Wood (1725-1807) President of the Royal College of Surgeons of Edinburgh 1822-1824, 1826-1828 and his son:
- Andrew Wood (surgeon) (1810-1881) President of the Royal College of Surgeons of Edinburgh 1855-1857 (memorial only)
- The Rev Thomas Rowland Wyer (1806-1891)

== Bibliography ==
- Marshall, J. M. (1986). The Life and Times of Leith. John Donald. ISBN 9780859761284.
