= St Albert's Catholic Chaplaincy, Edinburgh =

St Albert’s Catholic Chaplaincy
- St Albert the Great's Catholic Chaplaincy
- Blackfriars, Edinburgh
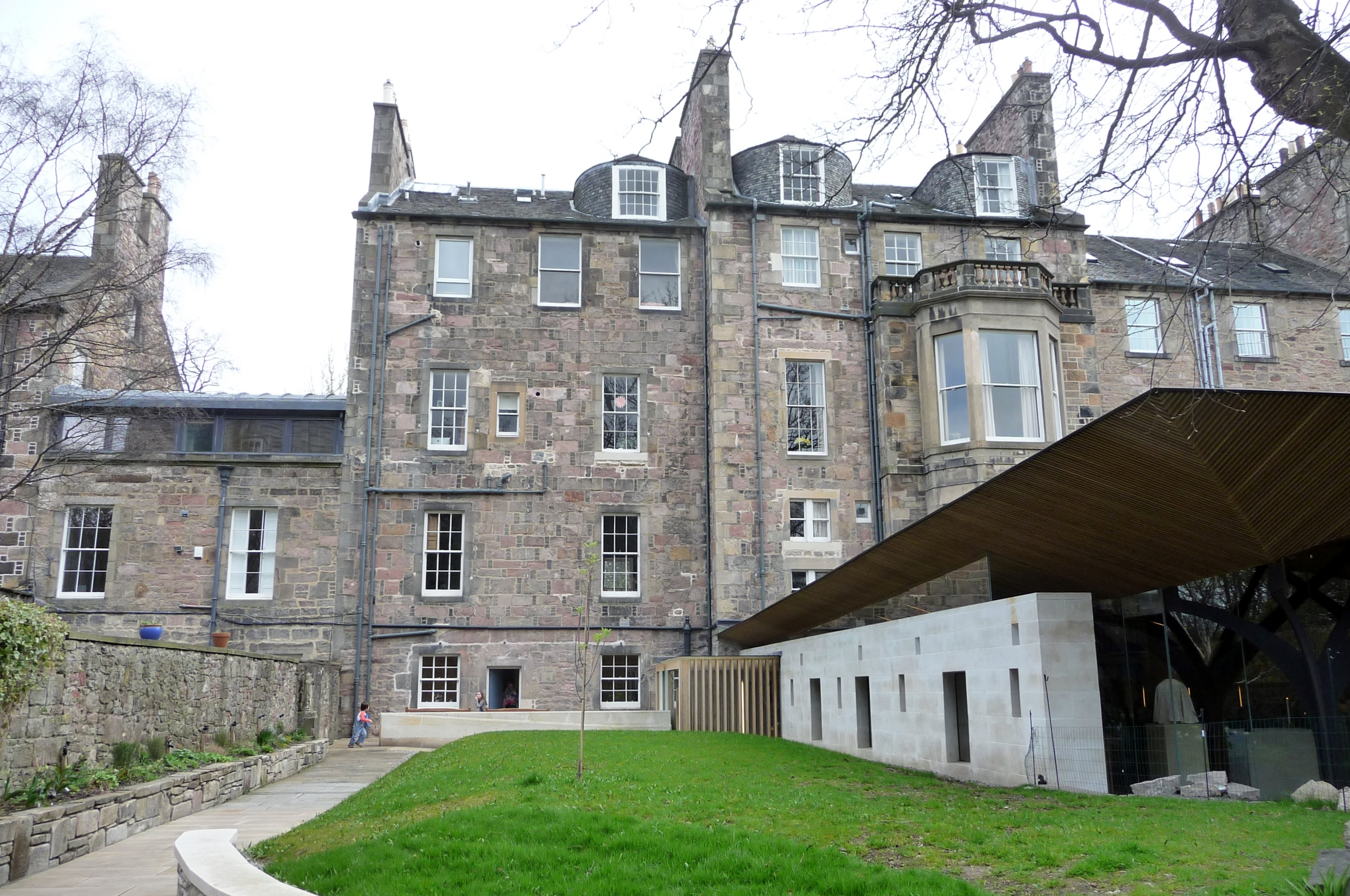
- St Albert's Chapel and building
- St Albert’s Catholic Chaplaincy
- 55.94321°N 3.19077°W
- Location: Edinburgh
- Country: Scotland
- Denomination: Roman Catholic
- Religious institute: Dominican Order
- Website: Scotland.op.org

History
- Dedication: Albertus Magnus
- Events: New chapel in 2012

Architecture
- Functional status: Active
- Heritage designation: Category A
- Designated: 14 December 1970
- Completed: 1779

Administration
- Archdiocese: St Andrews and Edinburgh
- Deanery: City of Edinburgh

St Albert's Catholic Chaplaincy is the Roman Catholic chaplaincy for the University of Edinburgh. It started in 1931, when the Dominican Order moved into the house. It is located at 23 and 24 George Square, south of the city centre, and north of The Meadows. The original building is category A listed and the chapel, built in 2012, won an award for architectural excellence from the Royal Institute of British Architects.

== History ==
=== Foundation ===
The original building was designed in 1766. It was built between 1766 and 1779, as part of the construction of George Square. According to Historic Environment Scotland, "George Square was the earliest, largest and most ambitious scheme of unified town planning attempted in Edinburgh to date." The building was designed by James Brown (1729-1807), brother of George Brown the Laird of Elliston and Lindsaylands, who the square is named after.

The first resident at 23 George Square was Thomas Lockhart. During the nineteenth century Arthur Conan Doyle stayed there as a medical student and in the twentieth century, Patrick Nuttgens resided there. 24 George Street, for many decades housed officers of the East India Company. In 1931 it was bought by the Dominican Order, who were then invited to be the chaplains to the Catholic community at the University of Edinburgh. The drawing room in the house was converted into the first chapel.

=== New chapel ===
In the 2000s, the chaplaincy needed a chapel with increased capacity. In July 2012, the new chapel, built in the garden, was completed and opened. It was the first new Dominican chapel in Scotland since the Reformation. It was designed by Stuart Allan, of the architectural firm Simpson & Brown. It has a capacity of 150 people and the window behind the altar has a clear view of the garden.

In 2013, the new chapel received architectural awards and recognition from the Scottish Civic Trust, the Royal Incorporation of Architects in Scotland, and the Royal Institute of British Architects.

== Chapel ==
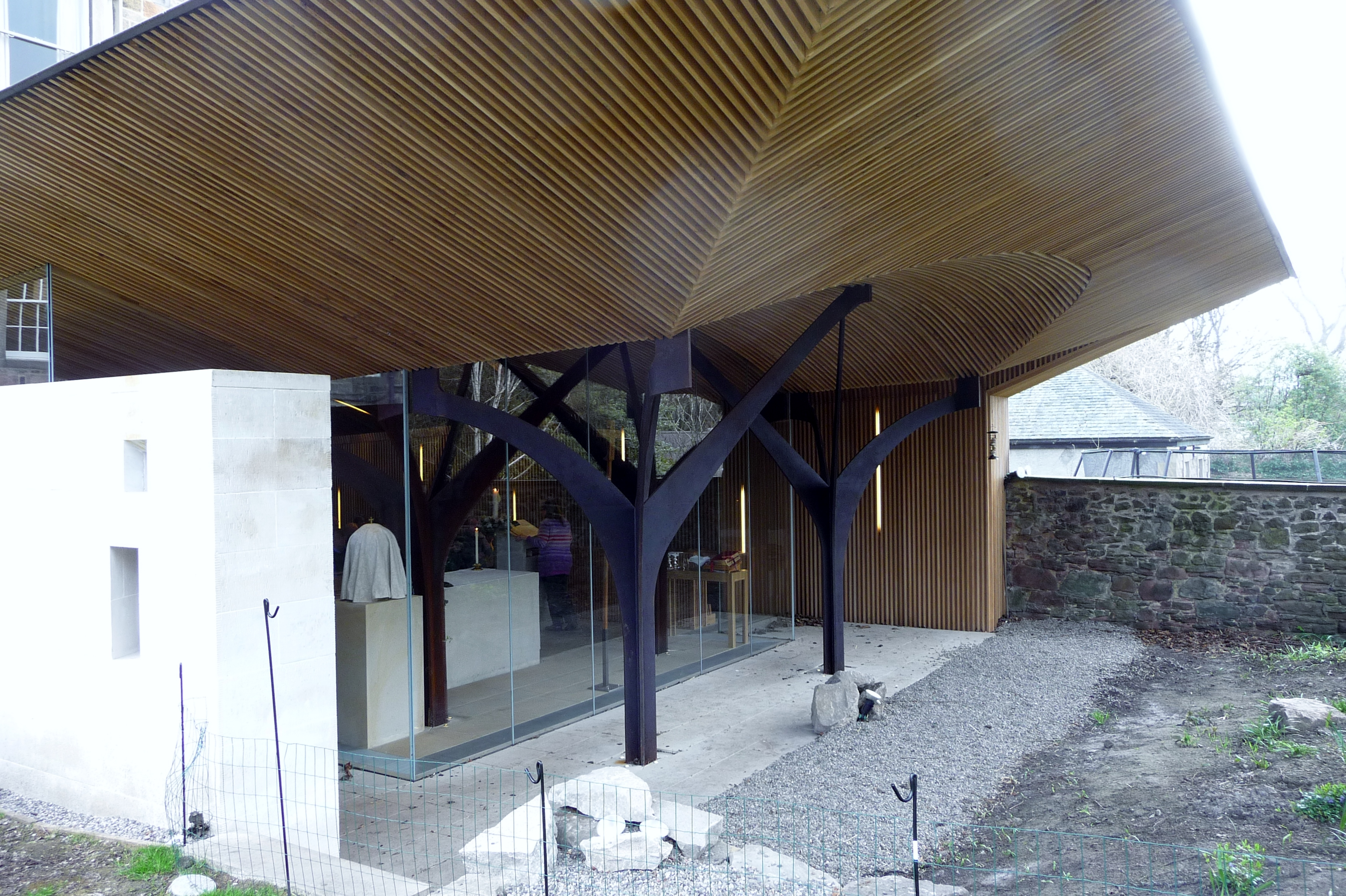
Window

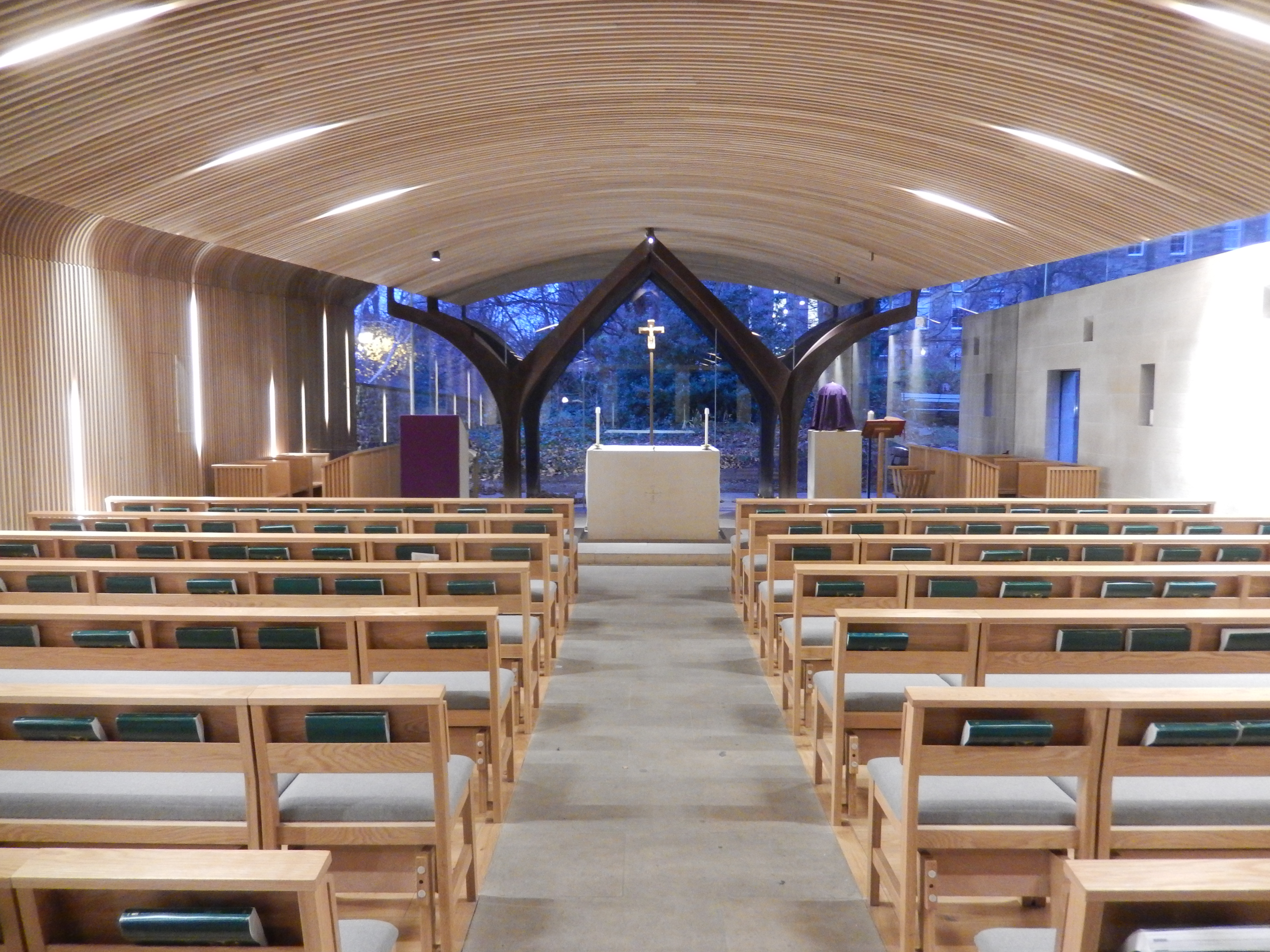
Interior

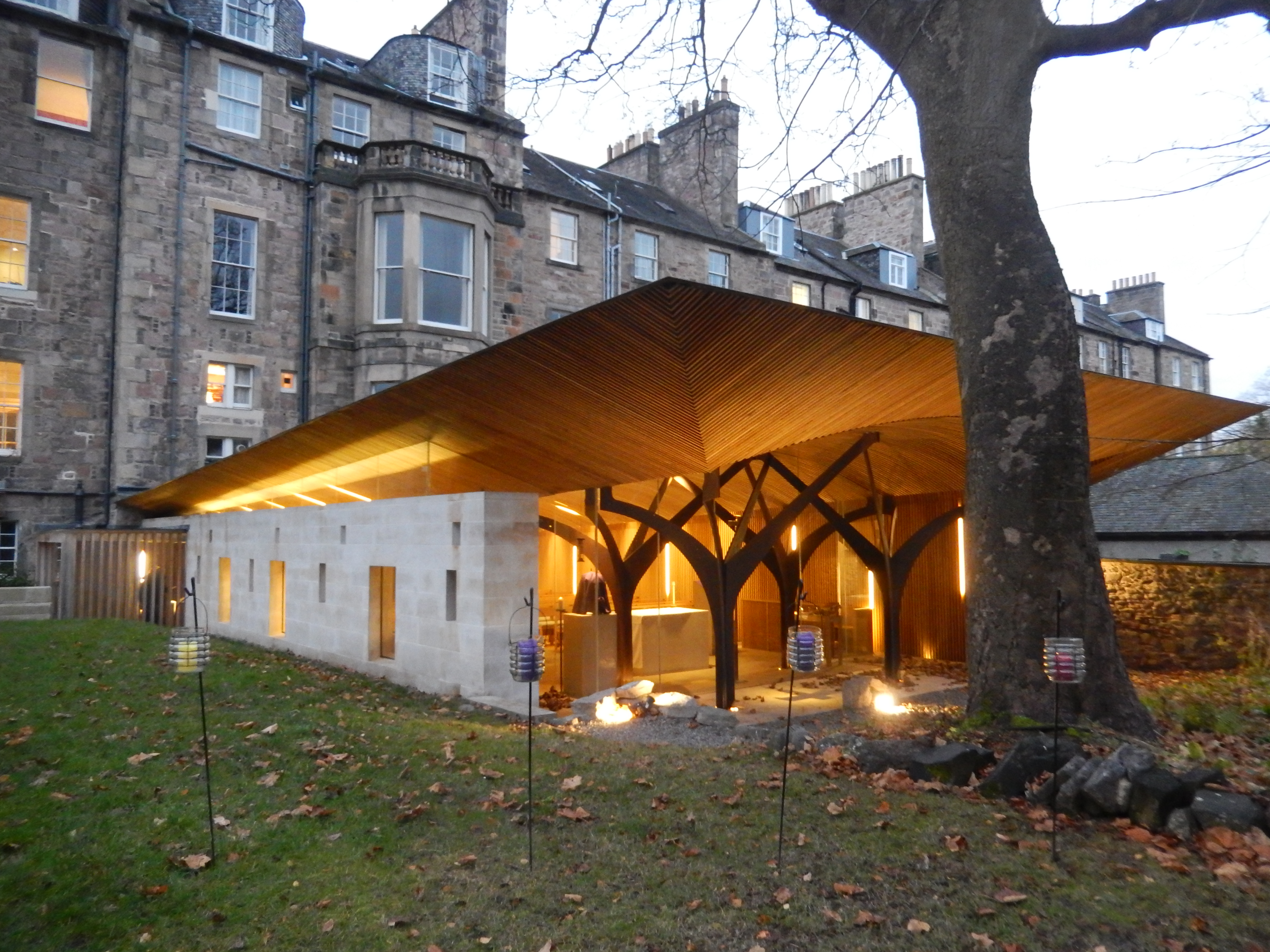
Chapel and garden

== See also ==
- Archdiocese of St Andrews and Edinburgh
