= Baillie baronets of Lochend (1636) =

The Baillie baronetcy, of Lochend in the County of Haddington, was created in the Baronetage of Nova Scotia on 21 November 1636 for the 20-year-old Gideon Baillie. He was the son of Sir James Baillie, Receiver of the Crown of Scotland. The title became dormant on the death of the 2nd Baronet c. 1648.

== Baillie baronets, of Lochend (1636) ==
- Sir Gideon Baillie, 1st Baronet (1616–1640), killed on active service in the explosion on 30 August 1640 at Dunglass Castle.
- Sir James Baillie, 2nd Baronet (d. c. 1648)
