= Lochend, Edinburgh =

Suburb of Edinburgh, Scotland, United Kingdom

Coordinates: 55°57′35″N 3°09′35″W

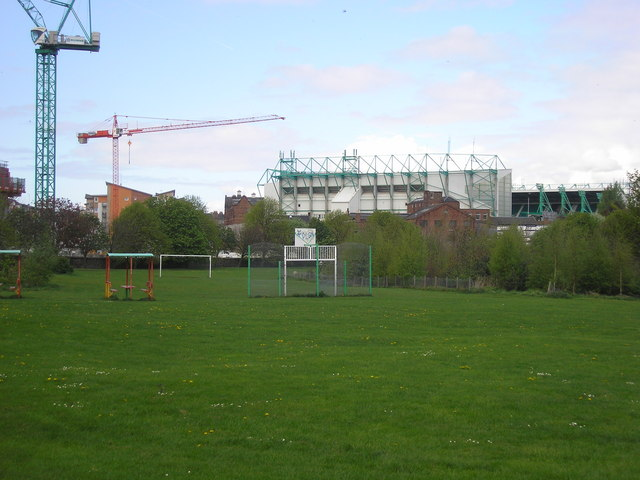
Lochend Park, with Easter Road Stadium in the background

Lochend is a mainly residential suburb of Edinburgh, the capital of Scotland. It is named after Lochend Castle and the adjacent Lochend Loch, located in the western part of Restalrig, approximately two miles from Edinburgh city centre. The suburb consists largely of a 1930s public housing estate, and is bounded on the west by Easter Road.

Lochend Loch is fed from underground springs. With no outlet stream, it was once used for a piped water supply to Leith but was partially filled in the 1960s to reduce water depth for safety reasons, and is now fenced and partly overgrown, providing a wildlife area. It forms a central feature of Lochend Park. Nearby, Lochend Castle was largely demolished in the 16th century, but surviving elements of it form part of the 19th century Lochend House. A 16th century beehive doocot, associated with the castle, stands in Lochend Park.

James IV of Scotland came to the Lochend to hunt wildfowl in September 1507, and four men were paid to row a boat on the "loch of Restalrig" to start the birds.
