= John Stevenson (mycologist) =

John Stevenson FRSE (1836–1903) was a 19th-century Scottish minister and amateur mycologist.

== Life ==
He was born in Coupar Angus on 17 July 1836, the son of Patrick James Stevenson.

He is thought to have studied Divinity at Aberdeen University. His first post as a minister was as assistant at Aberdeen West Parish Church. In 1861 he was ordained as minister of Millbrex church, north-east of Fyvie Castle. He moved to Dundee in 1865. In 1873 he succeeded Rev Dr John Tannoch as minister of Glamis Church.

As minister for the area covering Glamis Castle his parishioners included members of the Bowes-Lyon family including the Queen Mother and her brother Fergus Bowes-Lyon though circumstances meant that he did not christen either.

In 1888 he was elected a Fellow of the Royal Society of Edinburgh. His proposers were Hugh Macmillan, Alexander Dickson, James Geikie and John Gray McKendrick.

Stevenson, along with James Stirton, wrote an obituary for botanist Thomas King upon his death in 1896. It was published the following year in The Annals of Scottish Natural History.

He died in Glamis on 27 November 1903. He was succeeded as minister by Rev John Stirton.

== Family ==
In 1864 he married Elizabeth Valentine, daughter of John Vaklentine of Canada. They had one son and two daughters.

== Publications ==
- Mycologia Scotica (1879)
