= James Stirton =

James Stirton (1833 – 14 January 1917) was a Scottish physician and one of Scotland's leading experts on cryptogamic botany. His investigations in bryology and lichenology earned him a world-wide reputation.

== Biography ==
Stirton was born in Coupar Angus, Perthshire, in 1833.

Stirton taught mathematics from 1856 to 1858 at the Merchiston Castle School in Edinburgh. At the University of Edinburgh he graduated in 1857 L.R.C.P.Edin and in 1858 M.D.Edin. Soon after acquiring his M.D. he moved to Glasgow and established an extensive practice in obstetrics and gynaecology. In 1876 Stirton was appointed a lecturer in gynaecology at the Glasgow Royal Infirmary, where for many years he had charge of the gynaecological wards. In 1889 he became a professor of midwifery at Anderson's College Medical School and held the professorship for about fifteen years.

Stirton made many visits to the Scottish mountains to investigate lichens and mosses and there discovered numerous species that were previously undescribed. Correspondents from Canada, South America, Australia, New Zealand, South Africa, and elsewhere sent him cryptogamic collections for study. He described over 100 new lichen species from Australia, including 8 new lichen species from Tasmania.

He contributed the section Cryptogamic Flora (an account of mosses and lichens) to the 1876 book Notes on the Fauna and Flora of the west of Scotland (edited by Edward R. Alston). Stirton served as President of the Glasgow Society of Field Naturalists and contributed numerous articles to the Report and Transactions of the Glasgow Society of Field Naturalists, Glasgow Naturalist, Grevillea, the Scottish Naturalist, the Annals of Scottish Natural History, and other periodicals.

Stirton was elected a Fellow of the Linnean Society of London in December 1875 and was a Corresponding Member of several European scientific societies. His cryptogamic herbarium is mostly in the Natural History Museum, London with most of the remainder in the Glasgow Museums.

In 1859 he visited Egypt and in 1872 published The Climate of Egypt and Nubia, with Medical Hints to Invalids, &c..

In 1860 he married Jessie McLaren. They had two daughters, Elizabeth Watson (1861) and later Margaret Campbell. The botanist and taxonomist Charles Howard Stirton (b. 1949) is related to James Stirton.

Stirton, along with John Stevenson, wrote an obituary for botanist Thomas King upon his death in 1896. It was published the following year in The Annals of Scottish Natural History.

== Eponyms ==
=== Genus ===
Both lichens

- Stirtonia A.L.Sm. (Arthoniaceae family)
- Stirtoniella D.J.Galloway, Hafellner & Elix (Ramalinaceae family)

=== Species ===
- Bryum stirtonii Schimp., 1876 synonym of Bryum elegans Nees, 1827
- Cryptothecia stirtonii A.L.Sm., 1926
- Grimmia stirtonii Schimp., 1876 synonym of Grimmia trichophylla Grev., 1824
- Lecidea stirtoniana Zahlbr., 1925
- Melanotheca stirtoniana Müll.Arg., 1894
- Opegrapha stirtonii Zahlbr., 1923 synonym of Patellaria stirtonii (Zahlbr.) Ertz, 2009
- Parmelia stirtonii Zahlbr., 1929 synonym of Menegazzia stirtonii (Zahlbr.) Kantvilas & Louwhoff, 2004
- Usnea stirtoniana Zahlbr., 1930
- Zygodon stirtonii Schimp., 1871 synonym of Zygodon viridissimus Dicks.) Brid., 1826

== Selected publications ==
- "II. New and Rare Mosses from Ben Lawers, Perthshire". Transactions of the Botanical Society of Edinburgh. 10 (1–4): 426–432. 1870. doi:10.1080/03746607009468741.
- Stirton, J. (1873). "II.On New and Rare Mosses from Ben Lawers, Perthshire". Transactions of the Botanical Society of Edinburgh. 11 (1–4): 75–82. doi:10.1080/03746607309467932.
- Stirton, J. (1873). "III.Additions to the Lichen Flora of New Zealand". Transactions of the Botanical Society of Edinburgh. 11 (1–4): 490. doi:10.1080/03746607309468030.
- "New British lichens". Grevillea. 3: 33–37. 1874.
- Stirton, J. (1874). "XIII. Enumeration of the Lichens collected by H. N. Moseley, M. A., Naturalist to H.M.S. ' Challenger,' in the Islands of the Atlantic Ocean". Journal of the Linnean Society of London, Botany. 14 (77): 366–375. doi:10.1111/j.1095-8339.1874.tb00328.x.
- Stirton, J. (1875). "Additions to the Lichen-flora of New Zealand". Journal of the Linnean Society of London, Botany. 14 (78): 458–474. doi:10.1111/j.1095-8339.1875.tb00343.x.
- "Lichens, British and foreign". Report and Transactions of the Glasgow Society of Field Naturalists. 4: 85–95. 1876.
- "Additions to the lichen flora of South Africa". Report and Transactions of the Glasgow Society of Field Naturalists. 5: 211–220. 1877.
- "Description of recently discovered foreign lichens". Proceedings of the Royal Philosophical Society of Glasgow. 10: 156–164. 1877.
- "On new genera and species of lichens from New Zealand". Proceedings of the Royal Philosophical Society of Glasgow. 10: 285–306. 1877.
- "On certain lichens belonging to the genus Parmelia". The Scottish Naturalist. 4: 200–203, 252–254, 298–299. 1878.
- "Lichens growing on living leaves from the Amazons". Proceedings of the Royal Philosophical Society of Glasgow. 11: 99–111. 1878.
- "New and rare lichens from India and the Himalayas". Proceedings of the Royal Philosophical Society of Glasgow. 11: 306–322. 1879.
- Stirton, J. (1881). "Gynaecological Notes". Glasgow Medical Journal. 16 (5): 355–359. PMC 5900098. PMID 30433432.
- "A new genus of lichens". Transactions and Proceedings of the Royal Society of Victoria. 17: 1–2. 1881.
- "Additions to the lichen flora of Queensland". Transactions and Proceedings of the Royal Society of Victoria. 17: 66–78. 1881.
- "On the genus Usnea, and another (Eumitria) allied to it". The Scottish Naturalist. 6: 99–109. 1881.
- "Notes on the genus Usnea, with descriptions of new species". The Scottish Naturalist. 6: 292–297. 1882.
- "On vegetable parasites on the tea plant, more especially that of Assam". Proceedings of the Royal Philosophical Society of Glasgow. 13: 181–193. 1882.
- "New British mosses". The Scottish Naturalist. 9: 35–37. 1887.
- "A curious Lichen from Ben Lawers". The Scottish Naturalist. 9: 37–39. 1887.
- "On new Australian and New Zealand lichens". Transactions and Proceedings of the New Zealand Institute. 30: 382–393. 1897.
- "On new lichens from Australia and New Zealand". Transactions and Proceedings of the New Zealand Institute. 32: 70–82. 1899.
- Harvie-Brown, John Alexander; Trail, James William Helenus; Clarke, William Eagle (1902). "New and rare Scottish mosses". Annals of Scottish Natural History: 103–112.
- Stirton, James (1917). "Mosses from the Western Highlands". Transactions of the Botanical Society of Edinburgh. 26 (1–4): 44–49. doi:10.1080/03746601709469278.
- Stirton, James (1917). "Additional Mosses From West Ross-Shire". Transactions of the Botanical Society of Edinburgh. 26 (1–4): 241–247. doi:10.1080/03746601709469329. ISSN 0374-6607.

== See also ==
- Category:Taxa named by James Stirton
