= Thomas King (botanist) =

British botanist and author

- Born: 14 April 1834; Lochwinnoch, Renfrewshire, Scotland
- Died: 14 September 1896 (aged 62); Fochabers, Moray, Scotland
- Resting place: Paisley Abbey
- Occupation: Botanist

Thomas King (14 April 1834 – 14 September 1896) was a British botanist and author. He discovered twenty-nine species of plant while in Chile during the 1860s and 1870s.

In 1885, he contributed a section on Scotland's botany to Francis Hindes Groome's book Ordnance Gazetteer of Scotland: A Graphic and Accurate Description of Every Place in Scotland.

== Early life and career ==
King was born in 1834 at Yardfoot, a farm in Lochwinnoch, Renfrewshire. While attending school in Glenhead, he developed a love of nature, having grown up amongst it. In 1855, the family sold the farm and relocated to Glasgow. There, King trained as a teacher at the Normal Training College of the Free Church of Scotland, after which he taught in schools in Paisley and Chryston. In 1862, he was installed in the English and botany department of Glasgow's Garnet Bank Academy.

Failing health forced him to seek a warmer climate, and in July 1864 he set sail on a three-month journey to Chile, where one of his brothers lived. He resumed teaching, in Valparaiso, and also began collecting birds, insects, shells and plants.

While in South America, King met many native botanists, including R. A. Philippi, who was professor of natural history at the University of Chile in Santiago.

King's brother began working on a mineral railway in the Atacama Desert, and King used the connection to visit the area, where he discovered plant species rarely seen in the southern part of the country. He also discovered twenty-nine new species, including Stemmatum narcissoides, Ph. Philippi named some of them (including Schizostemma Kingii, Ph. and Tropɶlum Kingii, Ph.) after King, and one (Errazurizia glandulifera, Ph.) after Chile's new president, Federico Errázuriz Zañartu. King procured seeds of ornamental flowers, with the idea of introducing them to his homeland, and he presented several of these to Kew in 1892.

After nine years in Chile, King returned to Scotland for a visit, initially short-term. Under Professors Alexander Dickson and Isaac Bayley Balfour, he studied classes in botany at the University of Glasgow. His health having improved during his time abroad, he decided to remain in Glasgow, living at 110 Hill Street in Garnethill. He taught botany at several institutions, including at the Eastern Mechanics Institute and Glasgow Mechanics Institute, and in 1889 he was appointed professor of botany at the Anderson's College Medical School and Glasgow Veterinary College.

He was a member of the Geological Society of Glasgow, the Glasgow Society of Field Naturalists and the Natural History Society of Glasgow. He also co-founded the Microscopial Society of Glasgow, which was instituted in 1884. He was also a Fellow of the Cryptogamic Society of Scotland, becoming its honorary treasurer in 1883.

In 1891, he revised The Clydesdale Flora, originally written by Roger Hennedy in 1865.

== Death ==
With his sister at his bedside, King died at the Gordon Arms Hotel in Fochabers, Moray, on 14 September 1896. He had fallen ill with pleurisy five days earlier while attending the annual conference of the Cryptogamic Society. Aged 62, he was buried at Paisley Abbey on 18 September. He was survived by a sister, to whom he wrote letters about his rekindled love of botany while he was in Chile.

James Stirton and John Stevenson wrote an obituary for King in the following year's The Annals of Scottish Natural History.

== Bibliography ==
- The Clydesdale Flora
