= John Inglis, Lord Glencorse =

Scottish politician and judge (1810–1891)

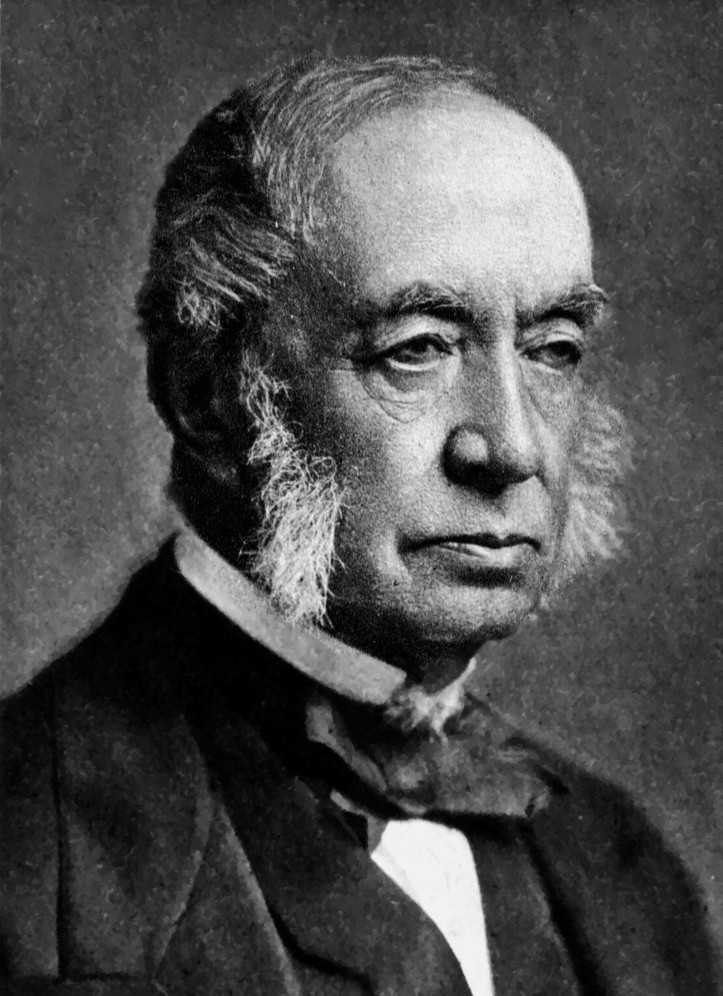
- Lord President Inglis

Member of Parliament for Stamford

Personal details
- Born: 21 August 1810 Edinburgh, Scotland
- Died: 20 August 1891 (aged 80) Edinburgh, Scotland
- Resting place: New Calton Cemetery
- Party: Conservative
- Relations: Alexander Wood (father-in-law)
- Parent: John Inglis (father)
- Occupation: politician and judge

John Inglis, Lord Glencorse, FRSE (21 August 1810 – 20 August 1891) was a Scottish politician and judge. He was Lord President of the Court of Session (1867–1891).

== Life ==
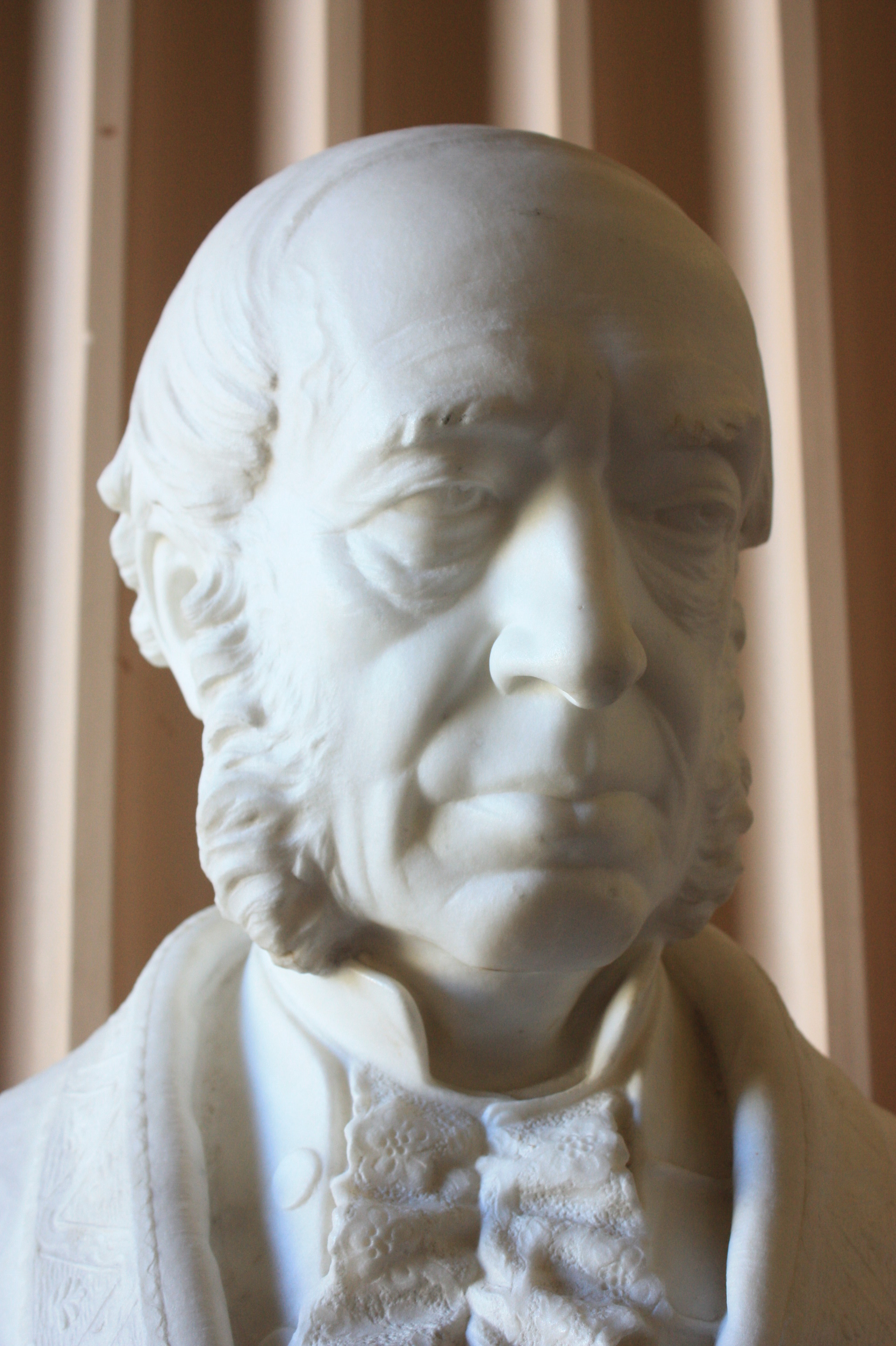
Bust of John Inglis, Lord Glencorse, by Charles McBride, 1893, Old College, University of Edinburgh

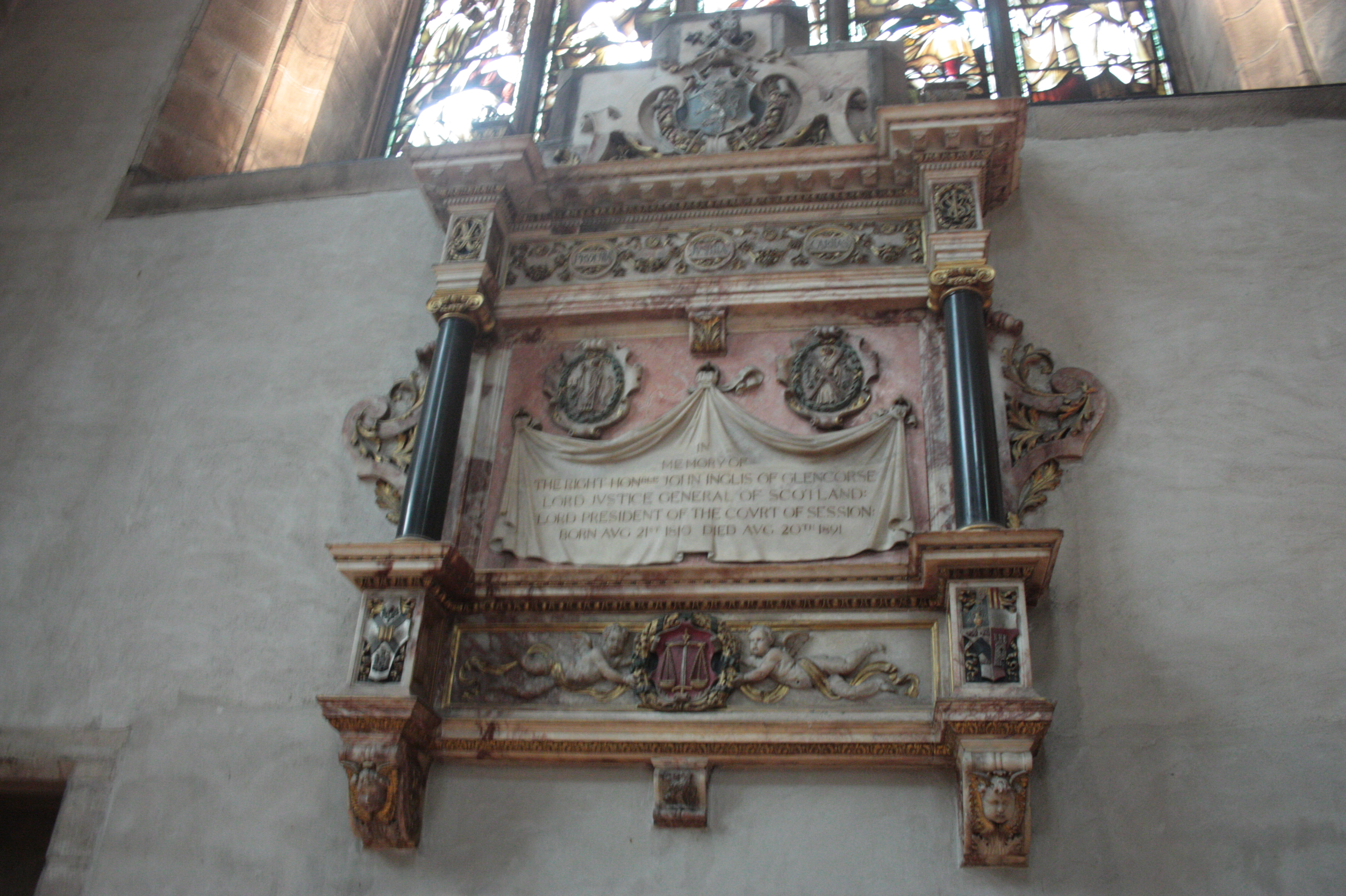
Memorial to John Inglis, Lord Glencorse, St Giles Cathedral

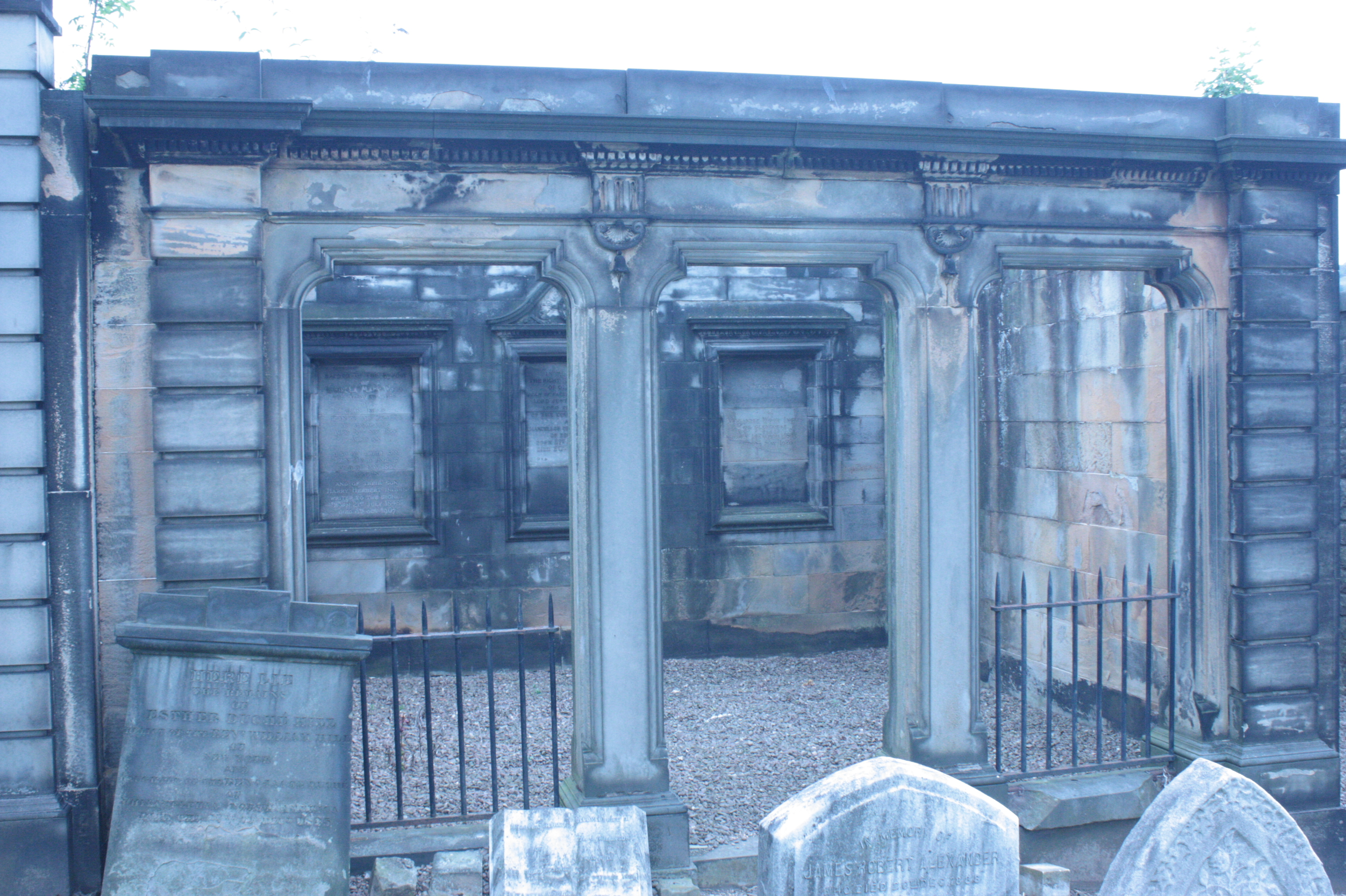
Lord Glencorse's vault, New Calton Cemetery

The youngest son of Maria Moxham Passmore and Rev John Inglis DD (1761–1834), minister of Old Greyfriars Kirk, Inglis was born on 21 August 1810 at 43 George Square in Edinburgh. He attended the High School in Edinburgh. He then studied law at the University of Glasgow from whence he went to Balliol College, Oxford. He graduated with a BA in 1834 and an MA in 1836.

Inglis was admitted a member of the Faculty of Advocates in 1835, and in 1852 he was made Solicitor General for Scotland in Lord Derby's first ministry, three months later becoming Lord Advocate, a post he held from May to December of that year. In the summer of 1857, he famously served as counsel for Madeleine Smith, who was the defender in a sensational murder trial. Smith was freed with a verdict of "not proven".

In March 1858 he resumed this office in Lord Derby's second administration, being returned to the House of Commons as member for Stamford. Again his tenure was brief, leaving office in July 1858. He was responsible for the Universities (Scotland) Act 1858, and in the same year he was elevated to the bench as Lord Justice Clerk, with the judicial title Lord Glencorse. In 1867 he was made Lord Justice General of Scotland and Lord President of the Court of Session. He was made a Privy Counsellor in 1859, and awarded a Doctor of Civil Law (DCL) by the University of Oxford in 1859.

Outside his judicial duties he was responsible for much useful public work, particularly in the department of higher education. In 1869 he was elected Chancellor of the University of Edinburgh against Gladstone, having already been Rector of the University of Aberdeen in 1857–1860 and Rector of the University of Glasgow in 1865.

Inglis was President of Scottish Texts Society and published Historical Study of Law 1863.

His Edinburgh address in later life was 30 Abercromby Place in Edinburgh's New Town.

He died at Loganbank, a villa in Glencorse south of Edinburgh on 20 August 1891, the day before his 81st birthday. He is buried in his family vault in New Calton Cemetery.

== Family ==
In 1842 he married Isabella Mary Wood (1820–1855), daughter of Alexander Wood, Lord Wood FRSE (1788–1864), a judge and one of his senior colleagues. They had two sons, John David Inglis (1843–1861) and Harry Herbert Inglis WS (1848–1907).

Inglis employed Rev Robert Keith Dick Horne as private tutor to his children. Horne was later minister of Corstorphine Old Parish Church in west Edinburgh.

== Memorials ==
A memorial to Lord Glencorse (in the Jacobean style) stands in the south-east corner of St Giles Cathedral on the Royal Mile in Edinburgh, above the stairway from the church to the crypt, near the entrance to the Thistle Chapel.

A bust of Lord Glencorse, sculpted by Charles McBride, is held by the University of Edinburgh.

== Notable cases ==
- In 1857 Inglis defended Madeleine Smith in a sensational murder trial.
- In 1865 Inglis presided over the case of the poisoner, Edward William Pritchard, the last person to be publicly hanged in Glasgow.

== In popular culture ==
Inglis was portrayed by Ian McCulloch in the Granada Television series Lady Killers, in an episode depicting the trial of Madeleine Smith.

Parliament of the United Kingdom
Preceded by Sir Frederic Thesiger; Lord Robert Cecil	Member of Parliament for Stamford; March 1858 – July 1858; With: Lord Robert Cecil	Succeeded by Lord Robert Cecil; Sir Stafford Northcote, Bt.
Legal offices
Preceded by George Deas	Solicitor General for Scotland; 1852	Succeeded by Charles Neaves
Preceded by Adam Anderson	Lord Advocate; May–December 1852	Succeeded by James Moncreiff
Preceded by James Moncreiff	Lord Advocate; March–July 1858	Succeeded by Charles Baillie
Preceded by John Hope	Lord Justice Clerk; 1858–1867	Succeeded by Lord Glenalmond
Preceded by Lord Colonsay	Lord Justice General; 1867–1891	Succeeded by Lord Robertson
Academic offices
Preceded by Viscount Palmerston	Rector of the University of Glasgow; 1865–1868	Succeeded by Earl of Derby
Preceded by Baron Brougham and Vaux	Chancellor of the University of Edinburgh; 1868–1891	Succeeded by Arthur Balfour
