= Charles McBride (sculptor) =

Scottish sculptor (1853–1903)

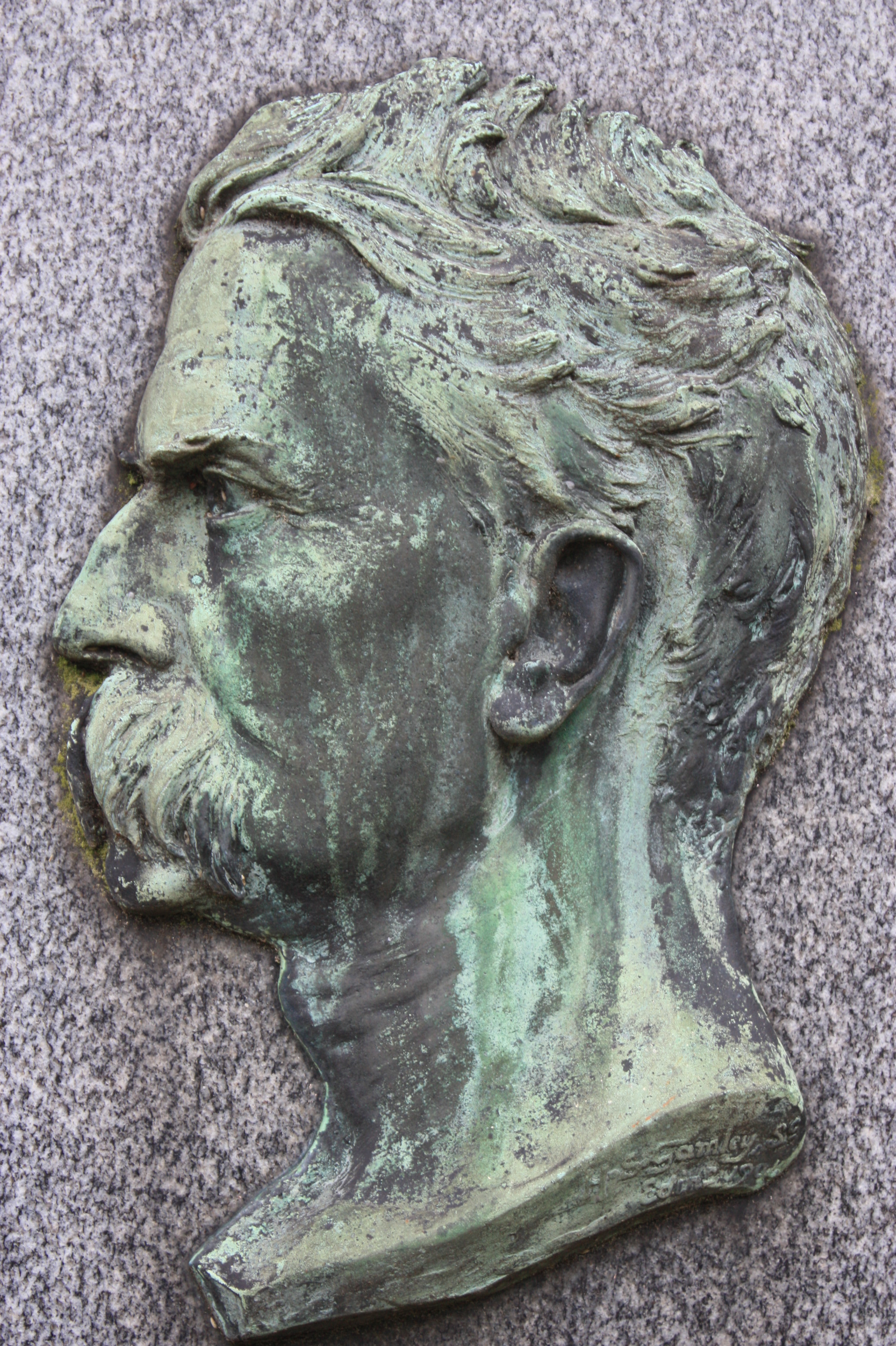
Charles McBride by Henry Snell Gamley

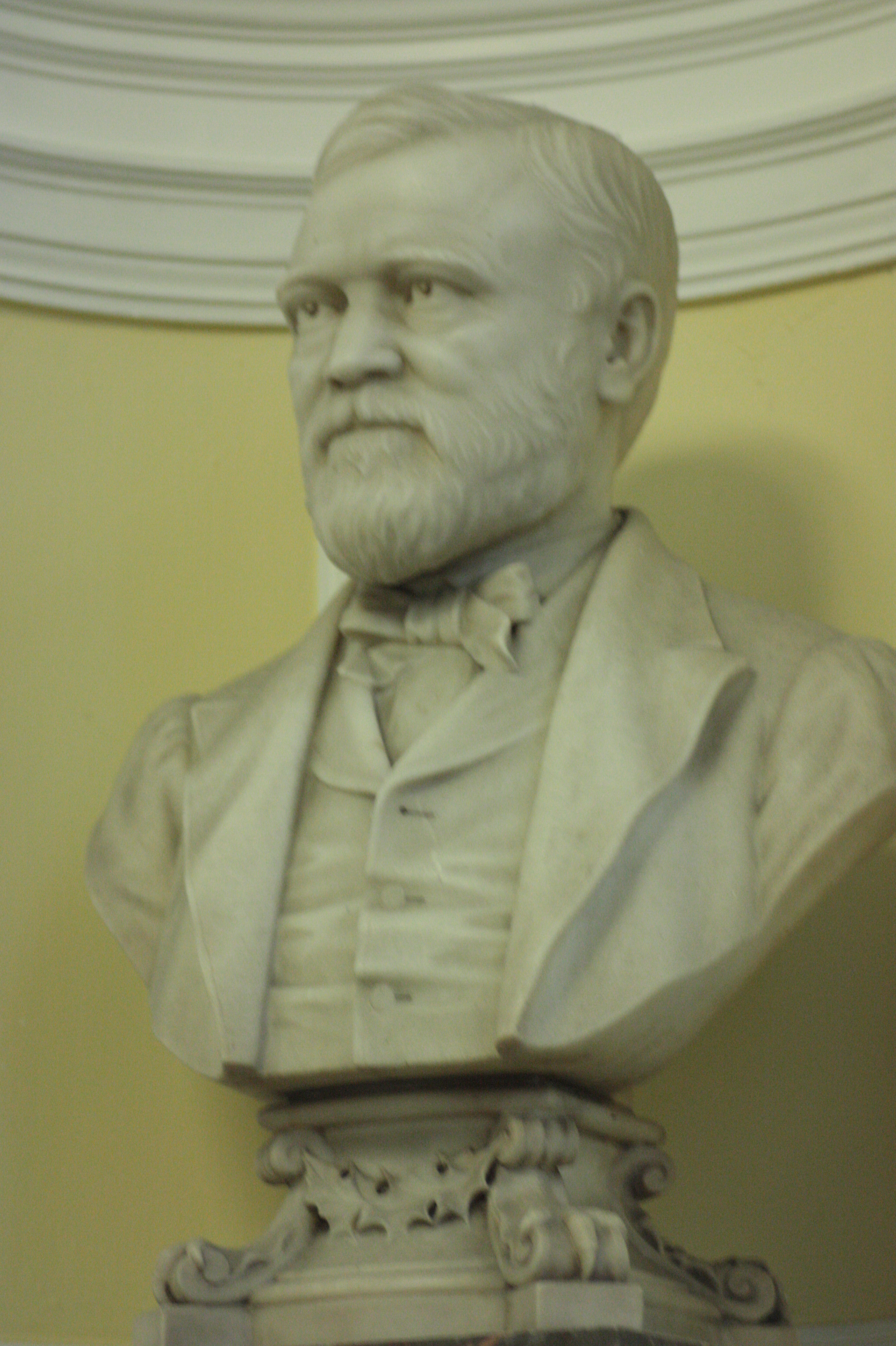
Andrew Carnegie by Charles McBride, Edinburgh Central Library

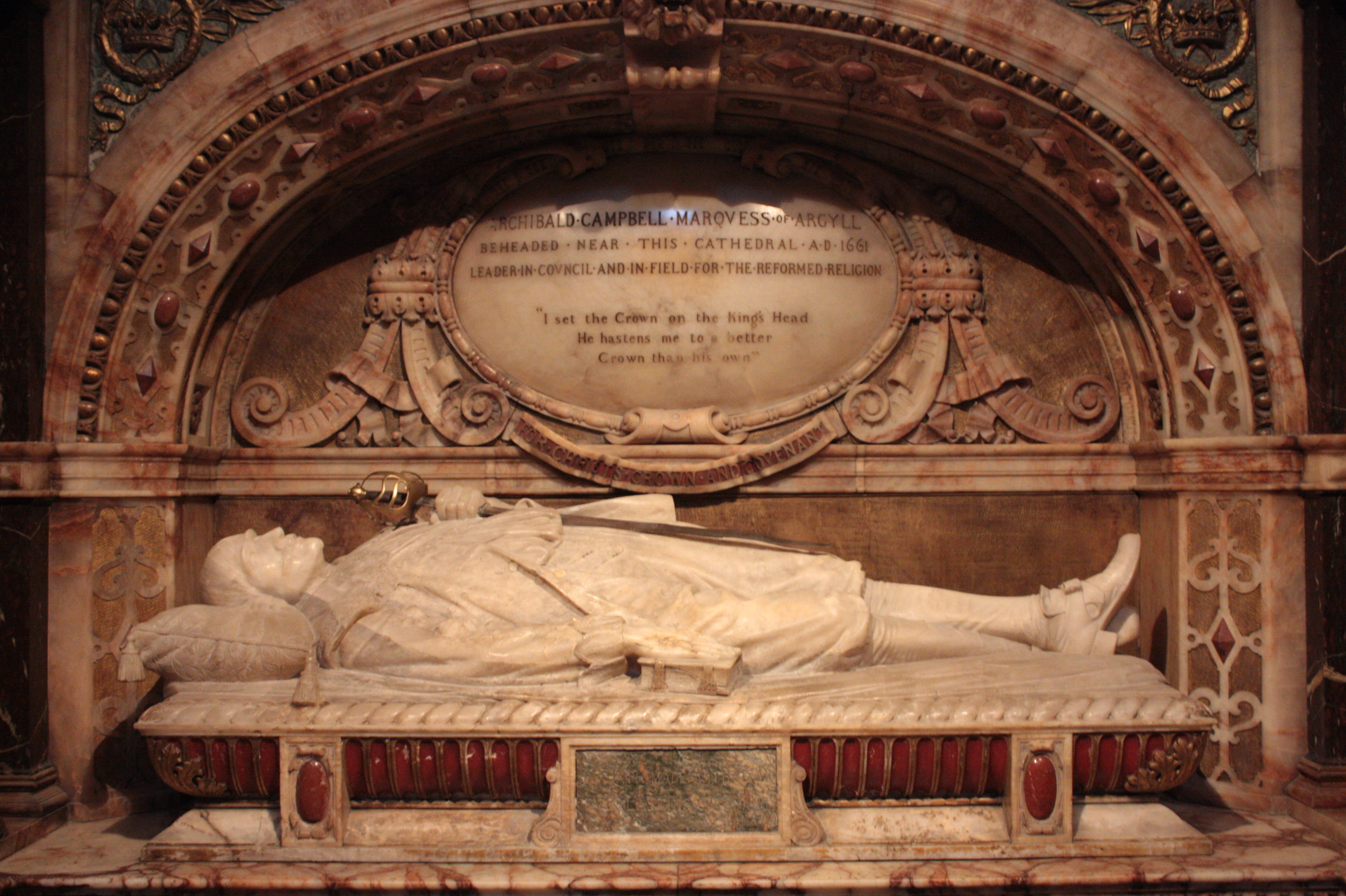
The Marquis of Argyll by Charles McBride, St Giles Cathedral, Edinburgh

Charles McBride (sometimes known as Charles McBryde; 1853 – 17 December 1903) was a Scottish sculptor active in the second half of the 19th century.

== Life ==
McBride was born in Edinburgh in June 1853.

He lived at 8 Hope Street just off Charlotte Square, facing his stone-yard at 7 Hope Street Lane (now built over).

He died in December 1903.

He is buried in the northern extension of Dean Cemetery in western Edinburgh. His grave is on the south side of the north path, towards the centre of the path, in the second row back. It holds a fine bronze head depicting McBride, carved by Henry Snell Gamley.

== Notable works ==
See

- Figure of Dougal Cratur, one of the smaller figures on the west facade of the Scott Monument, Edinburgh
- Bust of Thomas Carlyle (1885)
- Figures on the Scottish National Portrait Gallery, Edinburgh (1885–1890)
- Bust of Sir Alexander Grant, Principal of Edinburgh University (1887)
- Bust of Rev Prof John Ker DD (1819–1886), New College, Edinburgh (1887)
- Bust of Alexander Dickson, Edinburgh University (1889)
- Bust of Andrew Carnegie, Central Library, Edinburgh, George IV Bridge (1891)
- Bust of John Inglis, Lord Glencorse, Edinburgh University (1893)
- Reclining figure of Archibald Campbell, 3rd Marquis of Argyll, St Giles Cathedral (1897) (overall monument designed by Sydney Mitchell)
- Bust of Sir William Muir, Principal of Edinburgh University (1900)
