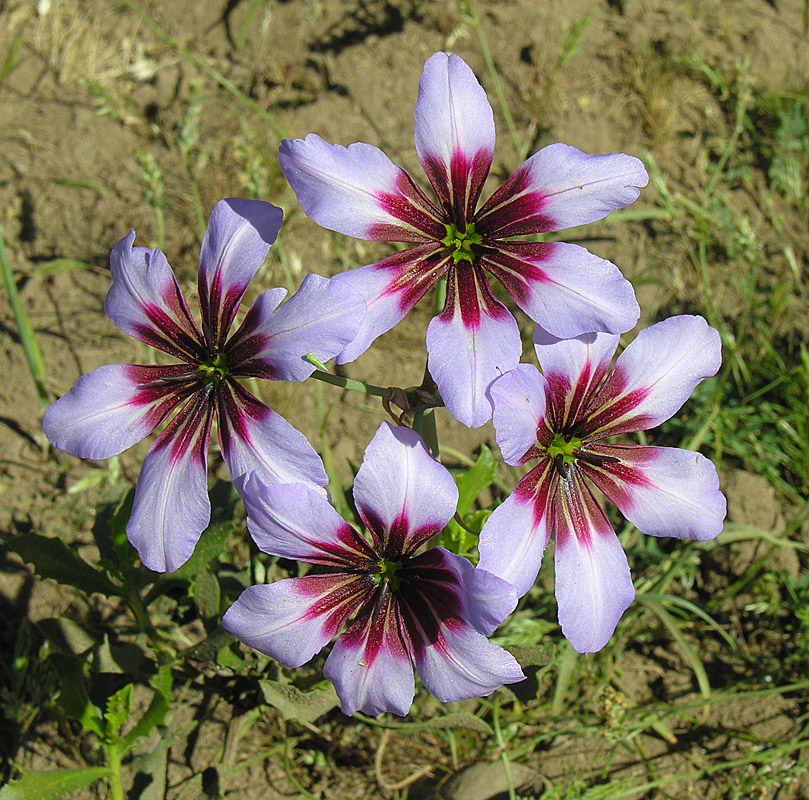
- Flowers
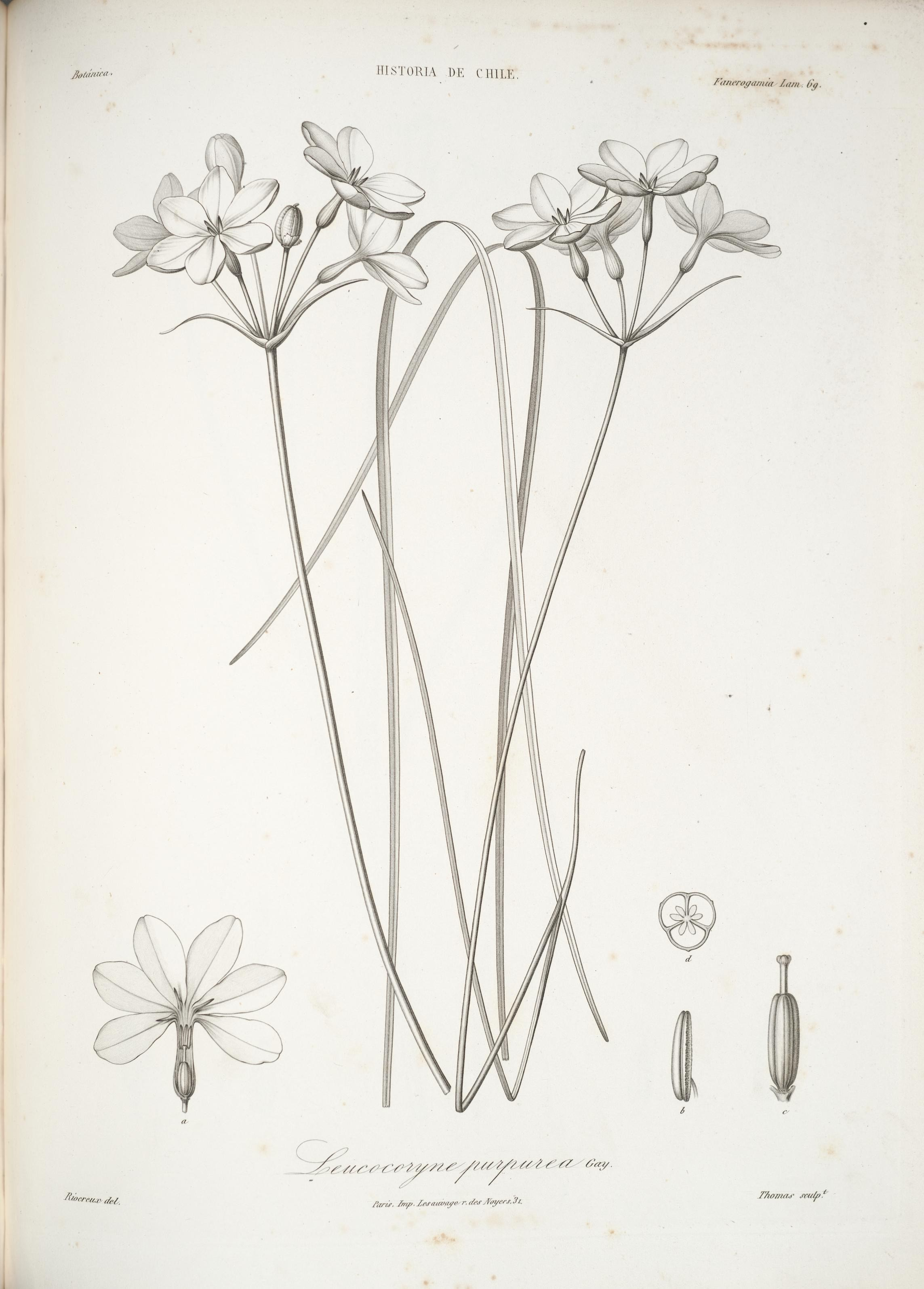
- Botanical illustration

Scientific classification
- Kingdom: Plantae
- Clade: Embryophytes
- Clade: Tracheophytes
- Clade: Spermatophytes
- Clade: Angiosperms
- Clade: Monocots
- Order: Asparagales
- Family: Amaryllidaceae
- Subfamily: Allioideae
- Genus: Leucocoryne
- Species: L. purpurea

Binomial name
- Leucocoryne purpurea Gay

Synonyms
- Leucocoryne ixioides var. purpurea (Gay) Baker

= Leucocoryne purpurea =

Species of flowering plant

Leucocoryne purpurea, called the purple glory-of-the-sun, is a species of flowering plant in the genus Leucocoryne, native to central Chile. It has gained the Royal Horticultural Society's Award of Garden Merit.
