= John Ker (minister) =

John Ker (1819–1886) was a Scottish ecclesiastical writer and minister in the United Presbyterian Church.

== Biography ==
Ker was born in Tweedmuir 1819. He was educated at the University of Edinburgh, he then spent some time in Germany in post-graduate work. He became pastor of East Campbell Church, Glasgow, in 1851; and in 1876 was appointed professor of practical training in the United Presbyterian Theological Hall. He died in 1886.

== Memorials ==
A marble bust of Ker, sculpted by Charles McBride, stands in New College in Edinburgh

== Works ==
Among his published works are:

- Sermons (1868–88)
- The Psalms in History and Biography (1886)
- Scottish Nationality (1887)
- The History of Preaching (1888)
- Letters (1890)
