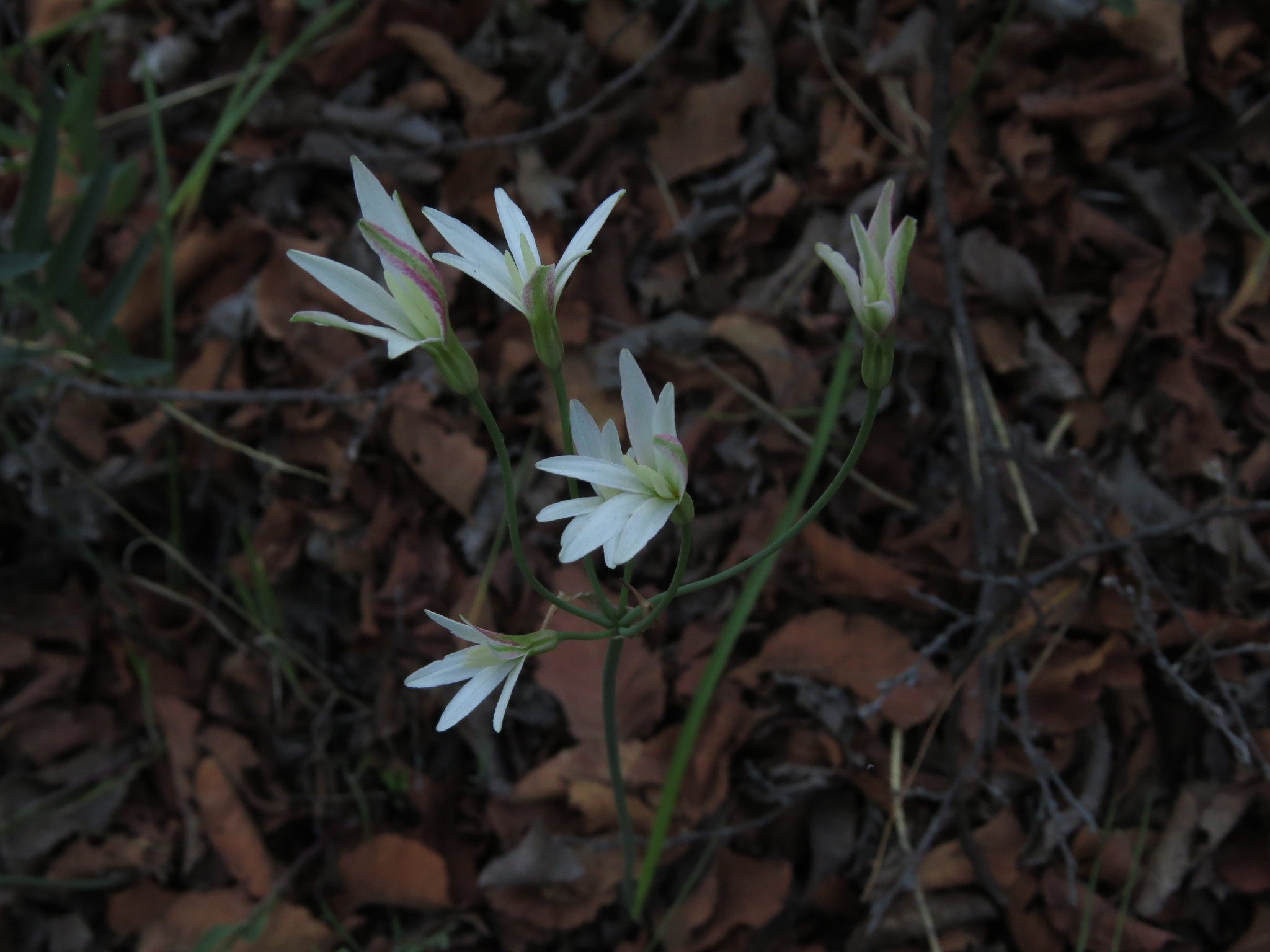

Scientific classification
- Kingdom: Plantae
- Clade: Tracheophytes
- Clade: Angiosperms
- Clade: Monocots
- Order: Asparagales
- Family: Amaryllidaceae
- Subfamily: Allioideae
- Genus: Leucocoryne
- Species: L. alliacea

Binomial name
- Leucocoryne alliacea Miers ex Lindl.

= Leucocoryne alliacea =

Species of plant

Leucocoryne alliacea is a species of flowering plant in the family Amaryllidaceae. It is endemic to Chile, where it is distributed between the Coquimbo and Los Lagos regions.
