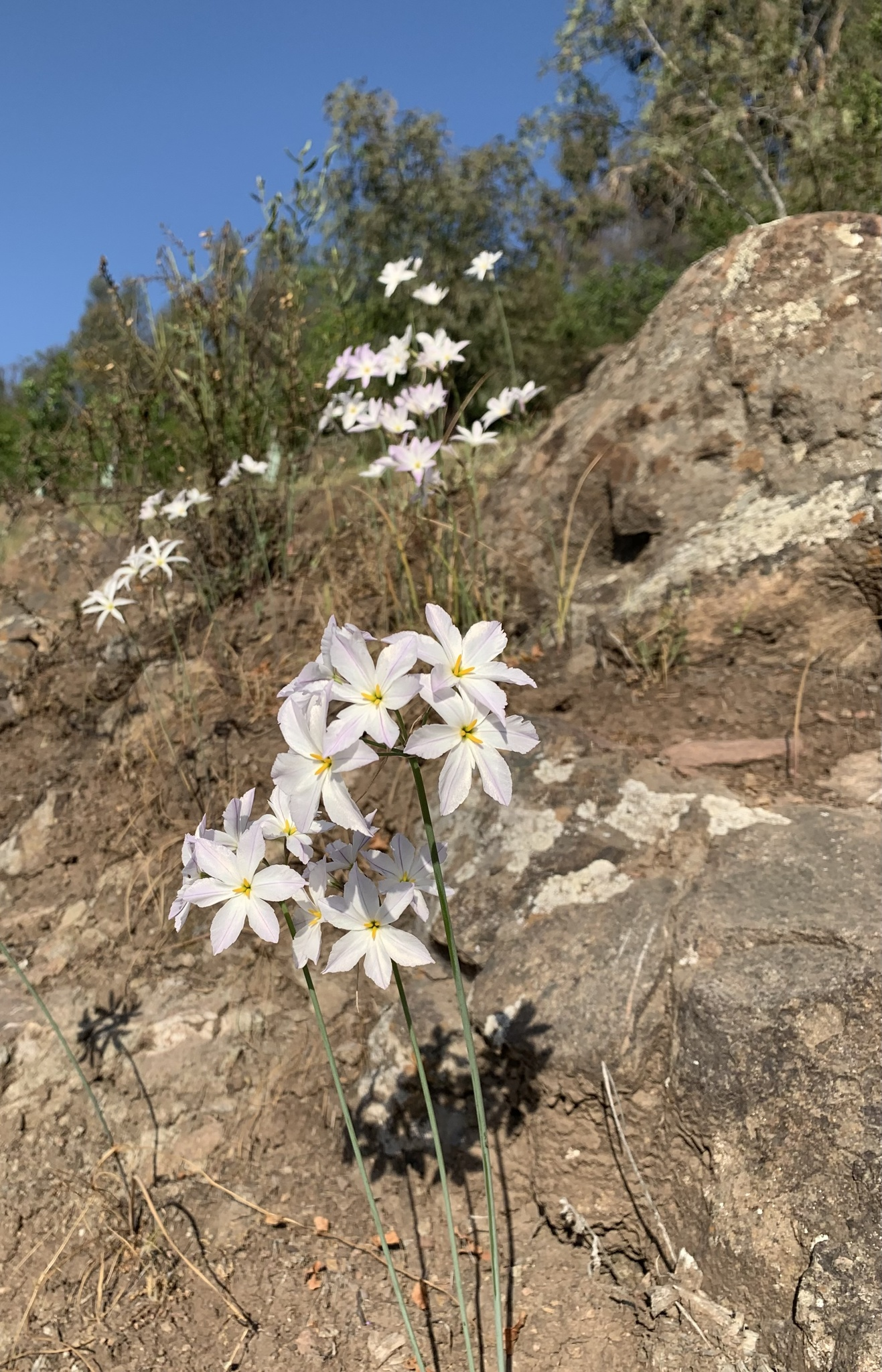
- Leucocoryne ixioides

Scientific classification
- Kingdom: Plantae
- Clade: Tracheophytes
- Clade: Angiosperms
- Clade: Monocots
- Order: Asparagales
- Family: Amaryllidaceae
- Subfamily: Allioideae
- Tribe: Leucocoryneae
- Genus: Leucocoryne; Lindl.

Type species
- Leucocoryne odorata Lindl.

Synonyms
- Antheroceras Bertero; Chrysocoryne Zoellner 1973 not Endl. 1843; Erinna Phil.; Pabellonia Quezada & Martic.; Stemmatium Phil.; Stephanolirion Baker

= Leucocoryne =

Genus of flowering plants

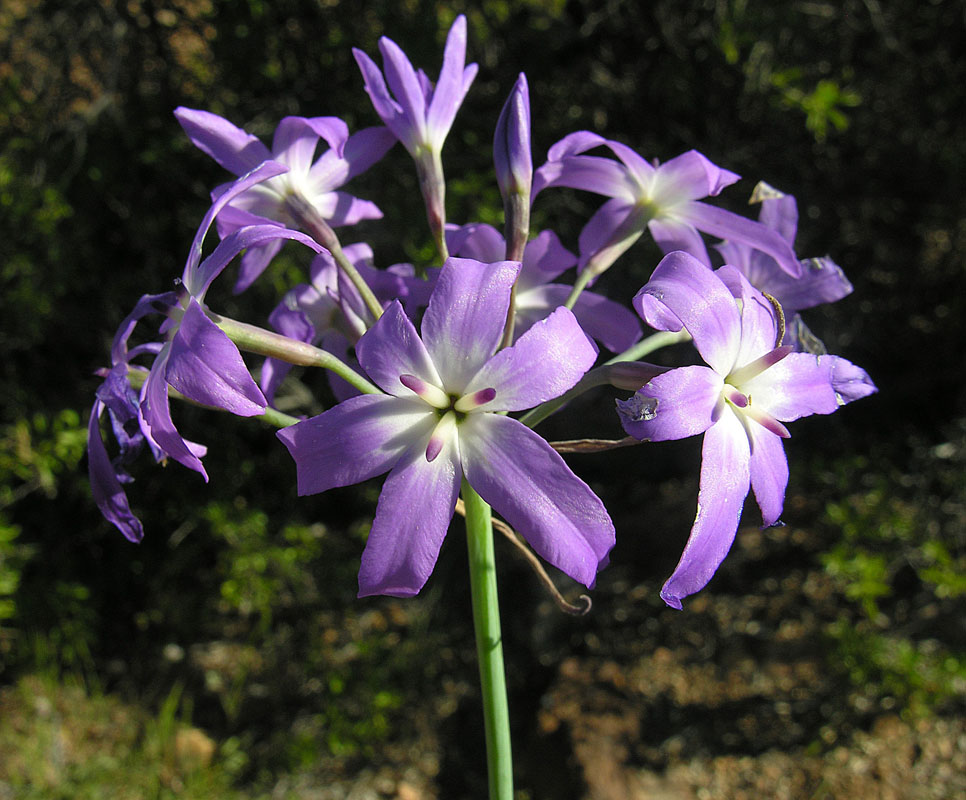
L. violascens

Leucocoryne (glory-of-the-sun) is a genus of bulbous perennial plants in the family Amaryllidaceae. The foliage of all species is long and narrow and has an onion-like scent. The blue, white or lilac flowers are held in umbels.

The entire genus is endemic to northern and central Chile in South America. Some species are grown in gardens as ornamentals. They require very well-drained soil and do not tolerate freezing temperatures. L. purpurea, with purple flowers, has gained the Royal Horticultural Society's Award of Garden Merit.

== Derivation of genus name ==
The generic name Leucocoryne is a compound of the Greek elements λευκός (= leucos) "white" and κορυνε (= korune) "club" (in the sense of cudgel or bludgeon) - in reference to the pale, club-like, sterile anthers of the flowers.

== Taxonomy ==
=== Species ===
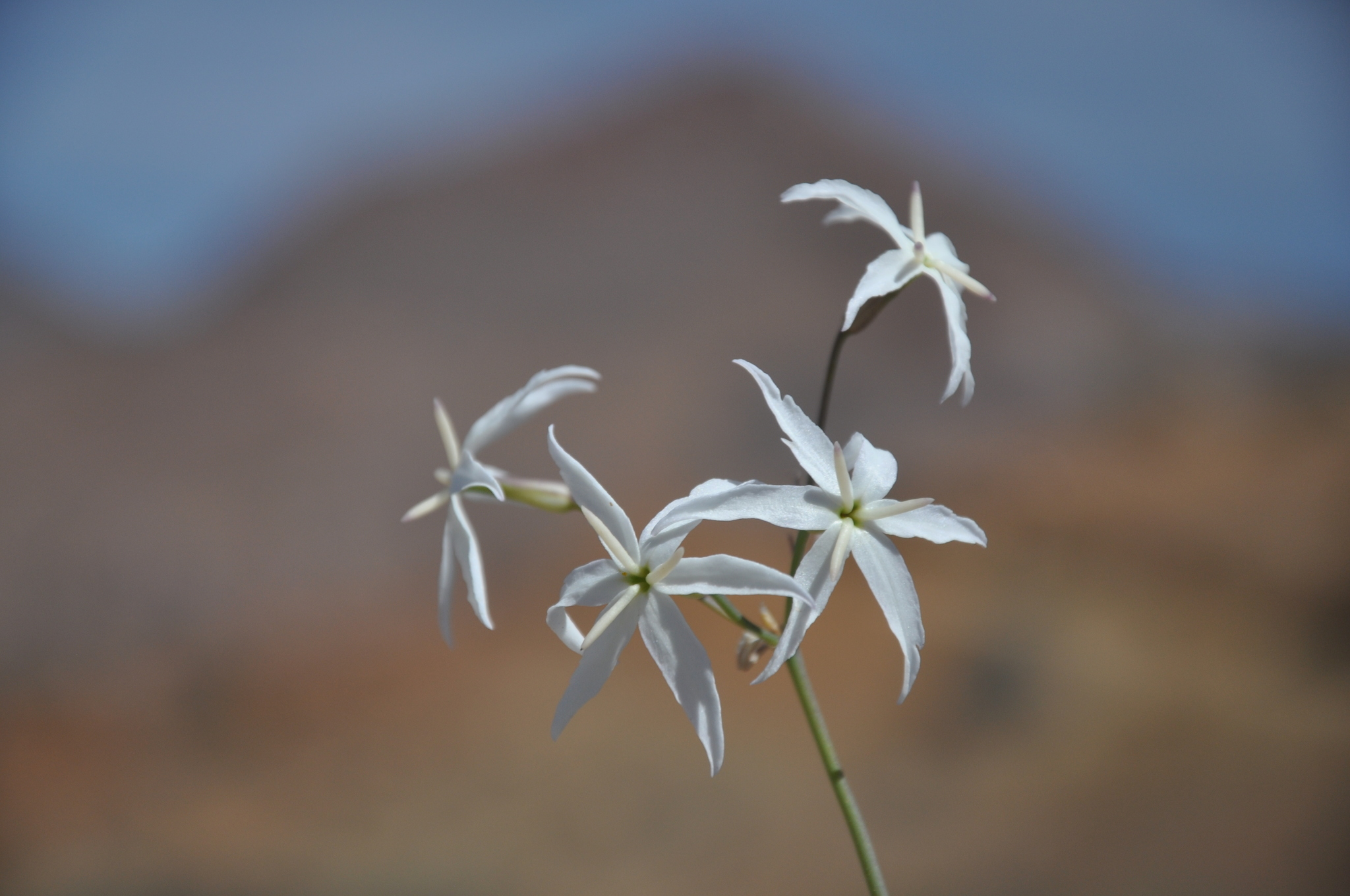
L. coquimbensis

Species accepted by The Plant List are listed here (49) although some authorities estimate only 15.

1. Leucocoryne alliacea Lindl.
2. Leucocoryne angosturae Ravenna
3. Leucocoryne angustipetala Gay
4. Leucocoryne appendiculata Phil.
5. Leucocoryne arrayanensis Ravenna
6. Leucocoryne candida Ravenna
7. Leucocoryne codehuensis Ravenna
8. Leucocoryne conconensis Ravenna
9. Leucocoryne conferta Zoellner
10. Leucocoryne coquimbensis F.Phil. ex Phil.
11. Leucocoryne coronata Ravenna
12. Leucocoryne curacavina Ravenna
13. Leucocoryne dimorphopetala (Gay) Ravenna
14. Leucocoryne editiana Ravenna
15. Leucocoryne foetida Phil.
16. Leucocoryne fragrantissima Ravenna
17. Leucocoryne fuscostriata Ravenna
18. Leucocoryne gilliesioides (Phil.) Ravenna syn. Erinna gilliesioides Phil.
19. Leucocoryne inclinata Ravenna
20. Leucocoryne incrassata Phil.
21. Leucocoryne ixioides (Sims) Lindl.
22. Leucocoryne leucogyna Ravenna
23. Leucocoryne lilacea Ravenna
24. Leucocoryne lituecensis Ravenna
25. Leucocoryne lurida Ravenna
26. Leucocoryne macropetala Phil.
27. Leucocoryne maulensis Ravenna
28. Leucocoryne modesta Ravenna
29. Leucocoryne mollensis Ravenna
30. Leucocoryne narcissoides Phil. (discovered by Scottish botanist Thomas King)
31. Leucocoryne odorata Lindl.
32. Leucocoryne pachystyla Ravenna
33. Leucocoryne pauciflora Phil.
34. Leucocoryne porphyrea Ravenna
35. Leucocoryne praealta Ravenna
36. Leucocoryne purpurea Gay
37. Leucocoryne quilimarina Ravenna
38. Leucocoryne reflexa Grau
39. Leucocoryne roblesiana Ravenna
40. Leucocoryne rungensis Ravenna
41. Leucocoryne simulans Ravenna
42. Leucocoryne subulata Ravenna
43. Leucocoryne taguataguensis Ravenna
44. Leucocoryne talinensis Mansur & Cisternas
45. Leucocoryne tricornis Ravenna
46. Leucocoryne ungulifera Ravenna
47. Leucocoryne valparadisea Ravenna
48. Leucocoryne violacescens Phil.
49. Leucocoryne vittata Ravenna

== Bibliography ==
- Jara-Arancio, Paola; Arroyo, Mary T. K.; Guerrero, Pablo C.; Hinojosa, Luis F.; Arancio, Gina; Méndez, Marco A.; Carine, Mark (February 2014). "Phylogenetic perspectives on biome shifts in Leucocoryne (Alliaceae) in relation to climatic niche evolution in western South America" (PDF). Journal of Biogeography. 41 (2): 328–338. Bibcode:2014JBiog..41..328J. doi:10.1111/jbi.12186. Archived from the original (PDF) on 4 March 2016.
- Sassone, Agostina B.; Arroyo-Leuenberger, Silvia C.; Giussani, Liliana M. (2014). "Nueva Circunscripción de la tribu Leucocoryneae (Amaryllidaceae, Allioideae)". Darwiniana. Nueva Serie. 2 (2): 197–206. doi:10.14522/darwiniana/2014.22.584. hdl:11336/37649. ISSN 0011-6793.
