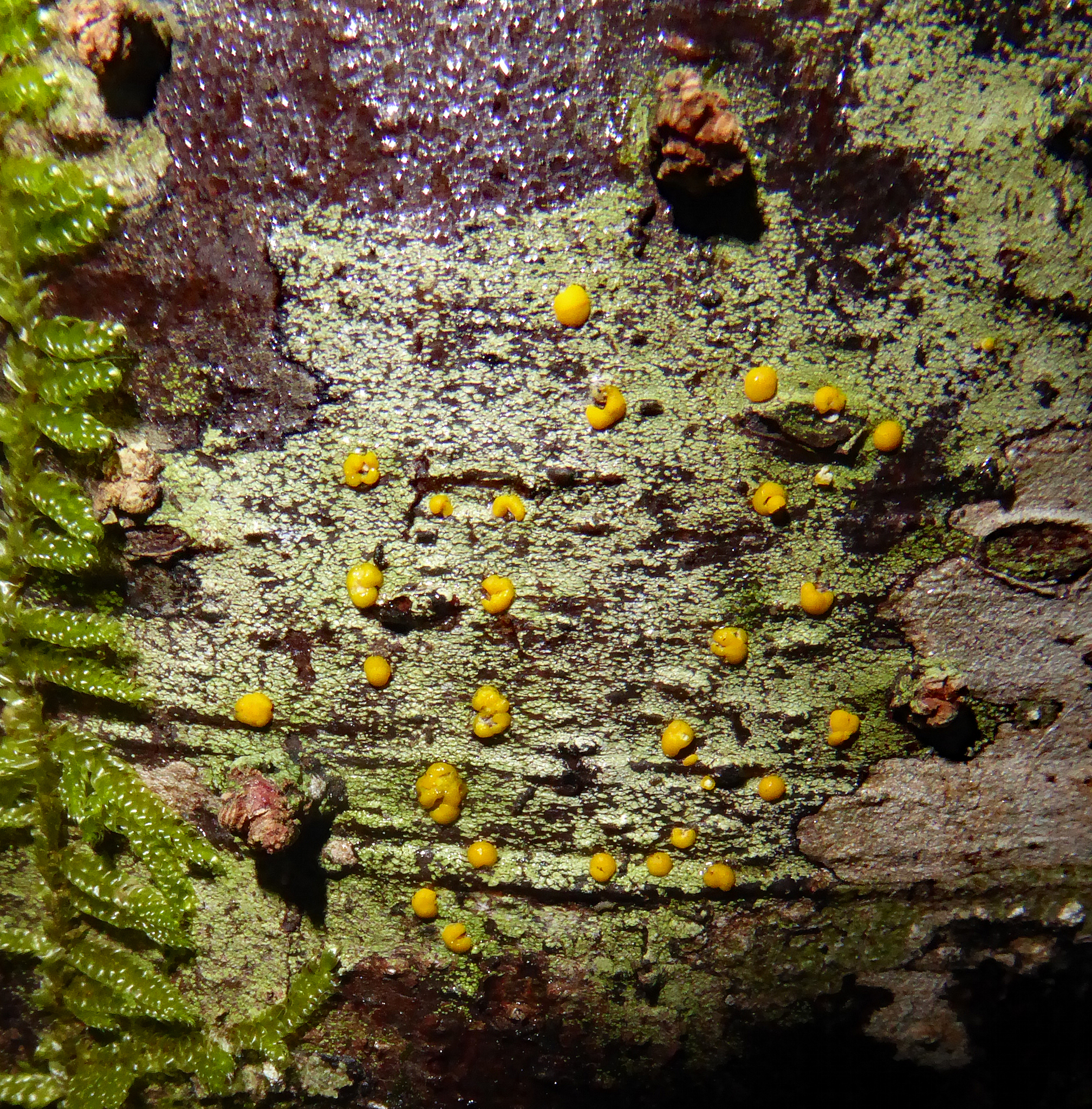

Scientific classification
- Domain: Eukaryota
- Kingdom: Fungi
- Division: Ascomycota
- Class: Lecanoromycetes
- Order: Lecanorales
- Family: Ramalinaceae
- Genus: Stirtoniella; D.J.Galloway, Hafellner & Elix (2005)
- Species: S. kelica

Binomial name
- Stirtoniella kelica (Stirt.) D.J.Galloway, Hafellner & Elix (2005)

Synonyms
- Lecidea kelica Stirt. (1873); Catillaria kelica (Stirt.) Zahlbr. (1926)

= Stirtoniella =

Genus of fungi

Stirtoniella is a lichen genus in the family Ramalinaceae. It is a monotypic genus, containing the single species Stirtoniella kelica, a crustose and corticolous lichen originally described from New Zealand in 1873 as a species of Lecidea. The photobiont is an alga of the family Chlorococcaceae. The genus is named after Scottish mycologist James Stirton.
