= Alexander Wood, Lord Wood =

Scottish lawyer (1788 – 1864)

The Hon Alexander Wood of Woodcote, Lord Wood FRSE (12 November 1788 – 18 July 1864) was a 19th-century Scottish lawyer who became a Senator of the College of Justice.

== Life ==
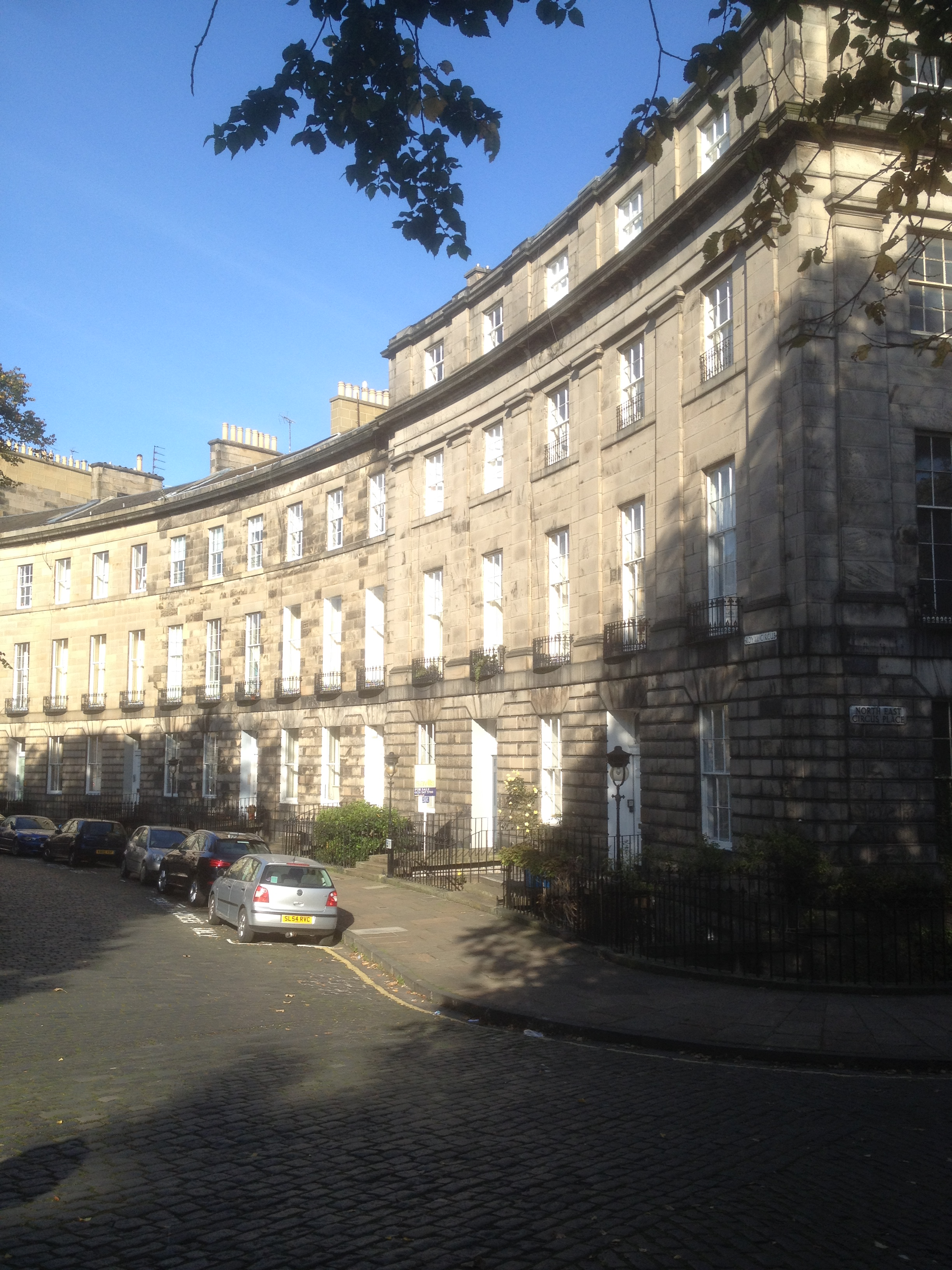
Royal Circus in Edinburgh

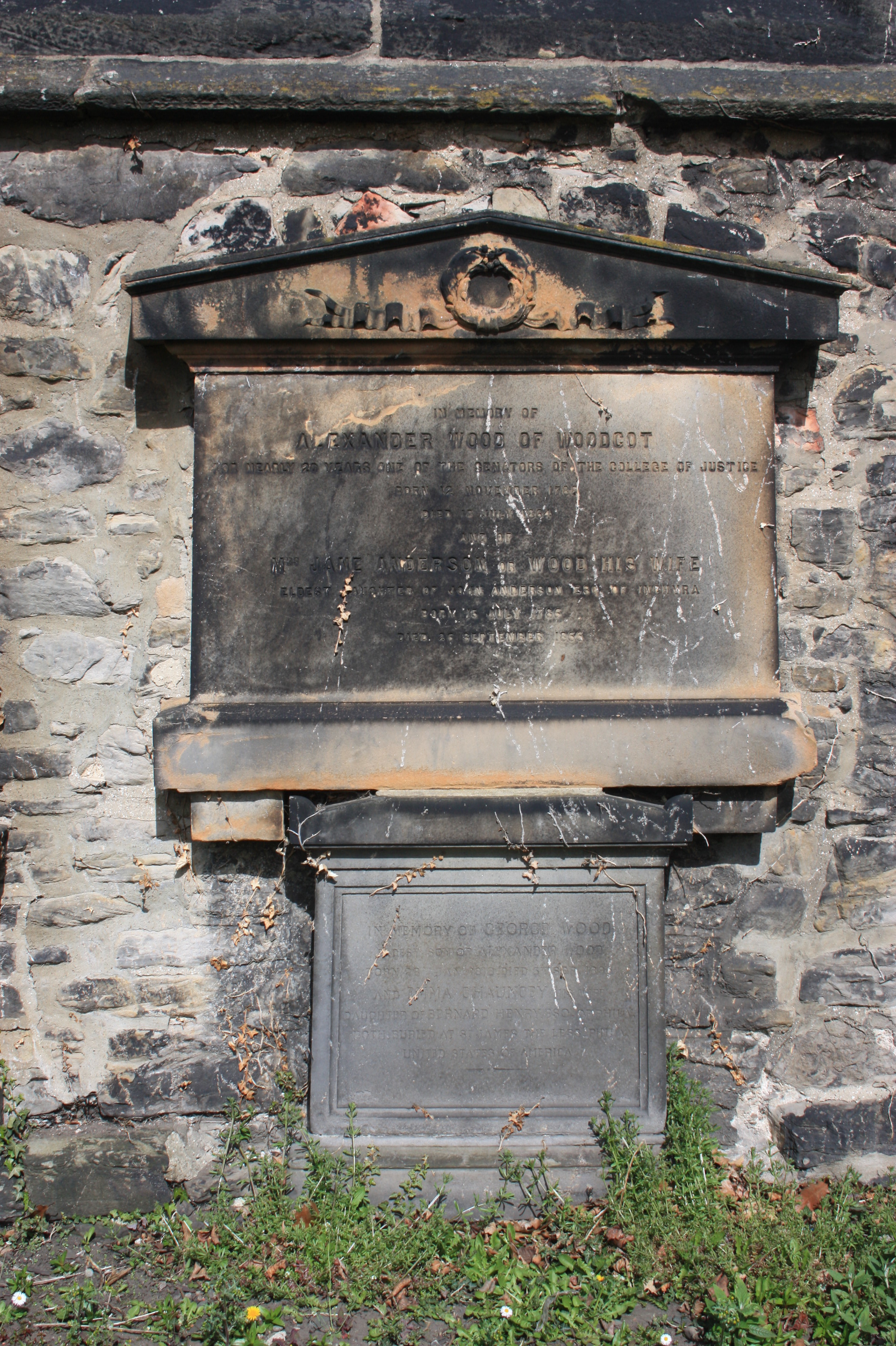
The grave of Alexander Wood, Lord Wood, Restalrig Churchyard

He was born on Blair Street, off the Royal Mile, Edinburgh on 12 November 1788, the son of Isabella Campbell, daughter of John Campbell of Glensaddle and Newfield, and her husband, George Wood, a surgeon. George Wood was the second son of Alexander Wood, an eminent Edinburgh surgeon. By 1800, the family was living at 6 St Andrew Square in Edinburgh's New Town. Wood was educated at the High School, Edinburgh and then studied law at the University of Edinburgh, graduating around 1808.

In 1811, he qualified as an advocate and in 1815 was living and working independently at 45 Queen Street. In 1826, he was elected a Fellow of the Royal Society of Edinburgh, his proposer being James Skene of Rubislaw.

In 1830, he was appointed Sheriff of Kirkcudbright and in 1841 Dean of the Faculty of Advocates.

In 1842, he succeeded Adam Gillies, Lord Gillies, on the latter's retirement, as a Senator of the College of Justice. He was then living at 1, Royal Circus in Edinburgh's Second New Town.

He died on 18 July 1864. He is buried with his family in Restalrig churchyard in eastern Edinburgh. The gravestone lies on the southern wall of the church.

== Family ==
In 1815, he married Jane Anderson (1786–1865) daughter of John Anderson of Inchyra. Their eldest son John Andrew Wood (1819–1890) was an advocate. Other sons included David William Wood and Alexander Wood. They had a daughter Isabella Mary Wood who married John Inglis, Lord Glencorse.

His uncle, Sir Alexander Wood, married the eldest daughter of Sir William Forbes of Pitsligo. His cousin was Dr Alexander Wood who was important in the development of the hypodermic needle.
