= Chancellor of the University of Edinburgh =

Titular head of the University of Edinburgh

The chancellor is the titular head of the University of Edinburgh. Their duties include conferring degrees, promoting the university's image throughout the world, and furthering its interests, both within Scotland and beyond.

The position was created in 1858; prior to this the university was governed by the Lord Provost, Magistrates, and Town Council of Edinburgh. Candidates for the position are nominated and elected by alumni.

The current chancellor is The Princess Royal.

== List of chancellors of the University of Edinburgh ==
- 1859–1868 Henry Peter Brougham, 1st Baron Brougham and Vaux
- 1868–1891 John Inglis, Lord Glencorse
- 1891–1930 Arthur James Balfour, 1st Earl of Balfour
- 1930–1937 James Matthew Barrie, 1st Baronet
- 1937–1940 John Buchan, 1st Baron Tweedsmuir
- 1946–1952 Victor Hope, 2nd Marquess of Linlithgow
- 1953–2010 Prince Philip, Duke of Edinburgh
- 2011–present Anne, Princess Royal

== Controversy ==
Some students and staff expressed criticism and protested against the "election" of Anne, Princess Royal, in 2011 under the banner "Party Against Privilege", criticising the princess as having "no connection to education" whilst being a "relic of an age where education was the domain of a privileged elite", stating that her installation was an "outrageous celebration of wealth and privilege" at a time when the university was cutting budgets and raising fees for many students to £9000 a year; others complained that the ceremony caused major disruption to teaching. The Student newspaper labelled the saga "A Fucking Disgrace". In January 2013 Edinburgh University Students' Association, the students' union, actively boycotted and campaigned against the Princess as Chancellor, calling for her resignation and a new democratic election process.

== See also ==
- Ancient university governance in Scotland
- Principal of the University of Edinburgh
- Rector of the University of Edinburgh
