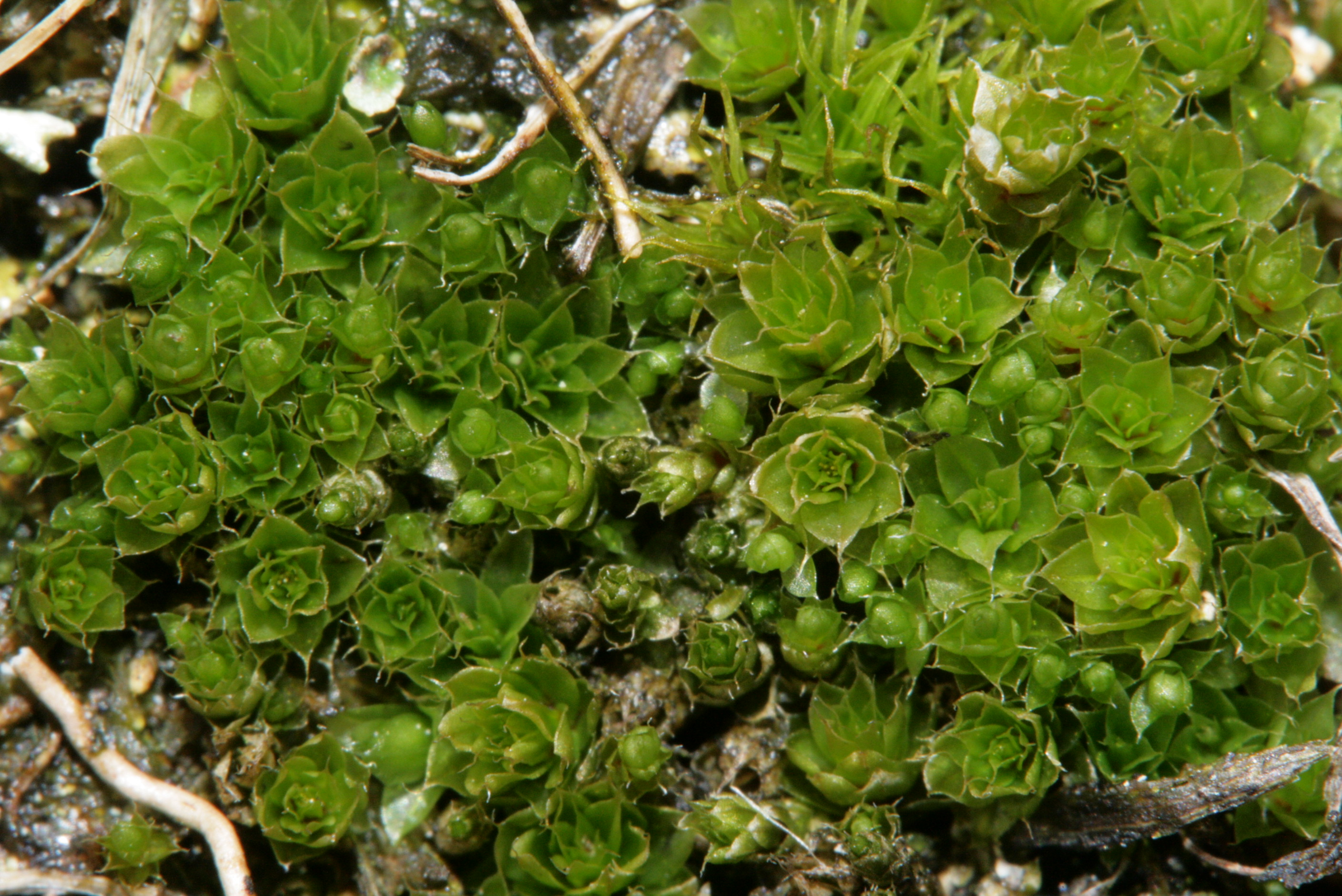

Scientific classification
- Kingdom: Plantae
- Division: Bryophyta
- Class: Bryopsida
- Subclass: Bryidae
- Order: Bryales
- Family: Bryaceae
- Genus: Rosulabryum
- Species: R. elegans

Binomial name
- Rosulabryum elegans (Nees ex Brid.) Ochyra

Synonyms
- Bryum capillare var. cochlearifolium Brid.; Bryum capillare var. ferchelii (Funck ex Brid.) Bruch & Schimp.; Bryum capillare var. rosulatum Mitt.; Bryum elegans Nees ex Brid.; Bryum elegans var. ferchelii (Funck ex Brid.) Breidl.; Bryum stirtonii Schimp.

= Rosulabryum elegans =

Species of moss

Rosulabryum elegans (syn. Bryum elegans), the blushing bryum, is a species of moss in the family Bryaceae. It is found in Norway, Poland, and Russia.

== Taxonomy ==
=== Basionym subspecies ===
The following subspecies were accepted before the name Rosulabryum elegans was accepted. The following names may be outdated and in need of revision:

- Bryum elegans var. barbatum C.E.O. Jensen, 1937
- Bryum elegans var. carinthiacum (Bruch & Schimp.) Breidl., 1891
- Bryum elegans var. elongatum Arnell, 1901
- Bryum elegans var. ferchelii (Funck ex Brid.) Breidl., 1891
- Bryum elegans subsp. fragile (Velen.) Podp., 1901
- Bryum elegans var. fragile Velen., 1897
- Bryum elegans subsp. haistii Kindb. ex Podp., 1954
- Bryum elegans var. intermedium Sapjegin Bot. Jahrb. Syst. 46 (Beibl. 105): 18. pl. 2: f. 21 1911
- Bryum elegans var. longipilum (Mönk.) Pavletić, 1955
- Bryum elegans var. norvegicum Kaurin & Arnell, 1896
- Bryum elegans var. rosulatum (Mitt.) Arnell, 1896
- Bryum elegans var. rubrum Podp., 1909
- Bryum elegans var. sanguineum Arnell, 1900
- Bryum elegans var. subelimbatum Jørg., 1896
- Bryum elegans var. terchelii Limpr., 1903
- Bryum elegans var. typicum Arnell, 1896

=== Synonyms ===
- Bryum elegans Grev., 1828, a synonym for Bryum pallens fo. speciosum (Voit) Podp.
- Bryum elegans Nees, 1827, a synonym for Bryum capillare Hedw. var. capillare

== Gallery ==
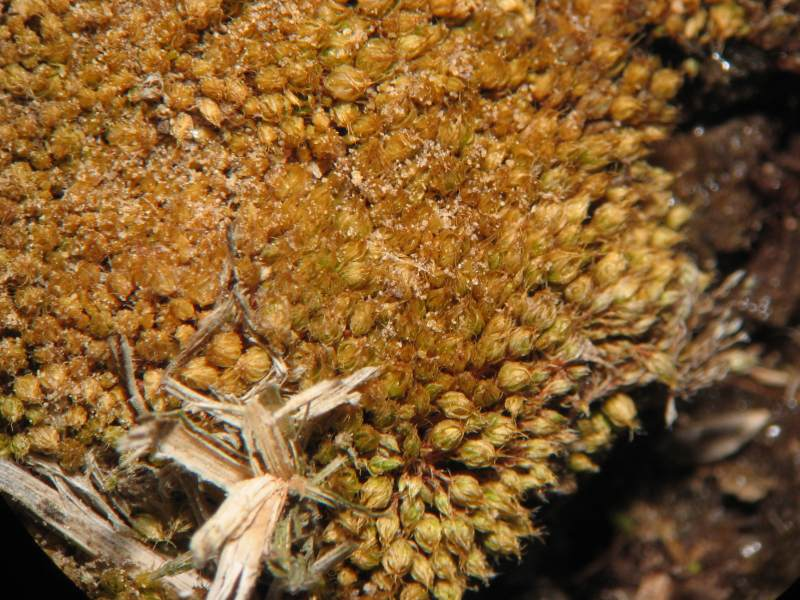
typical habitus of dried out plants,
Photo by Kristian Peters

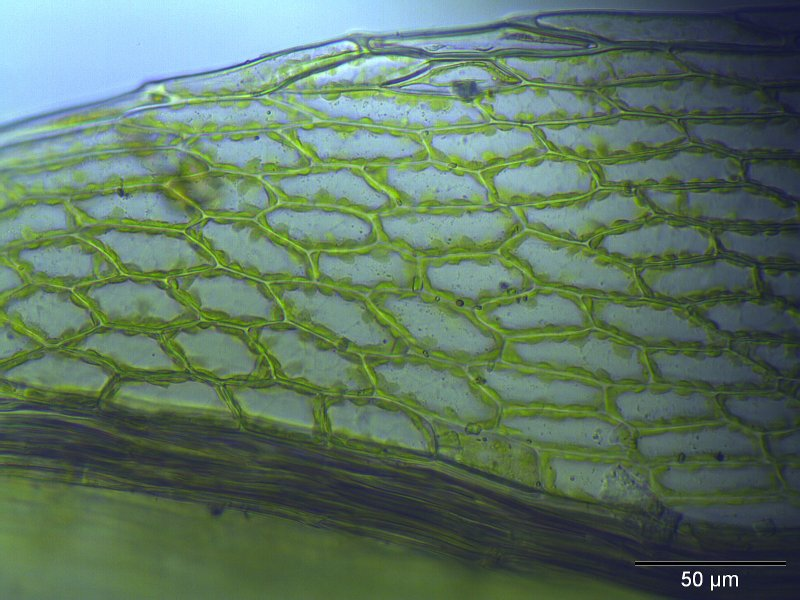
lamina cells, magnified 400 times,
Photo by Kristian Peters

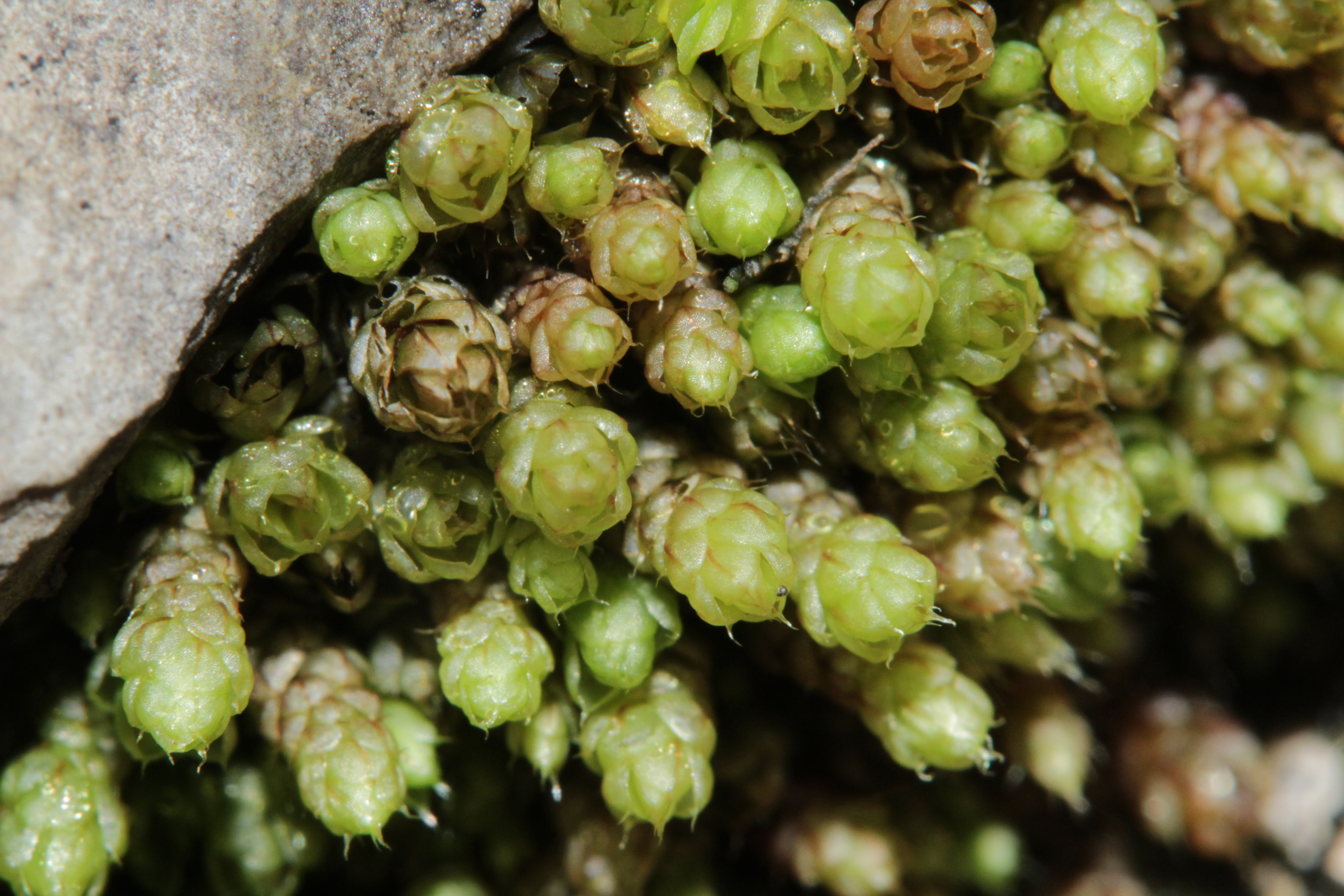
Bryum elegans

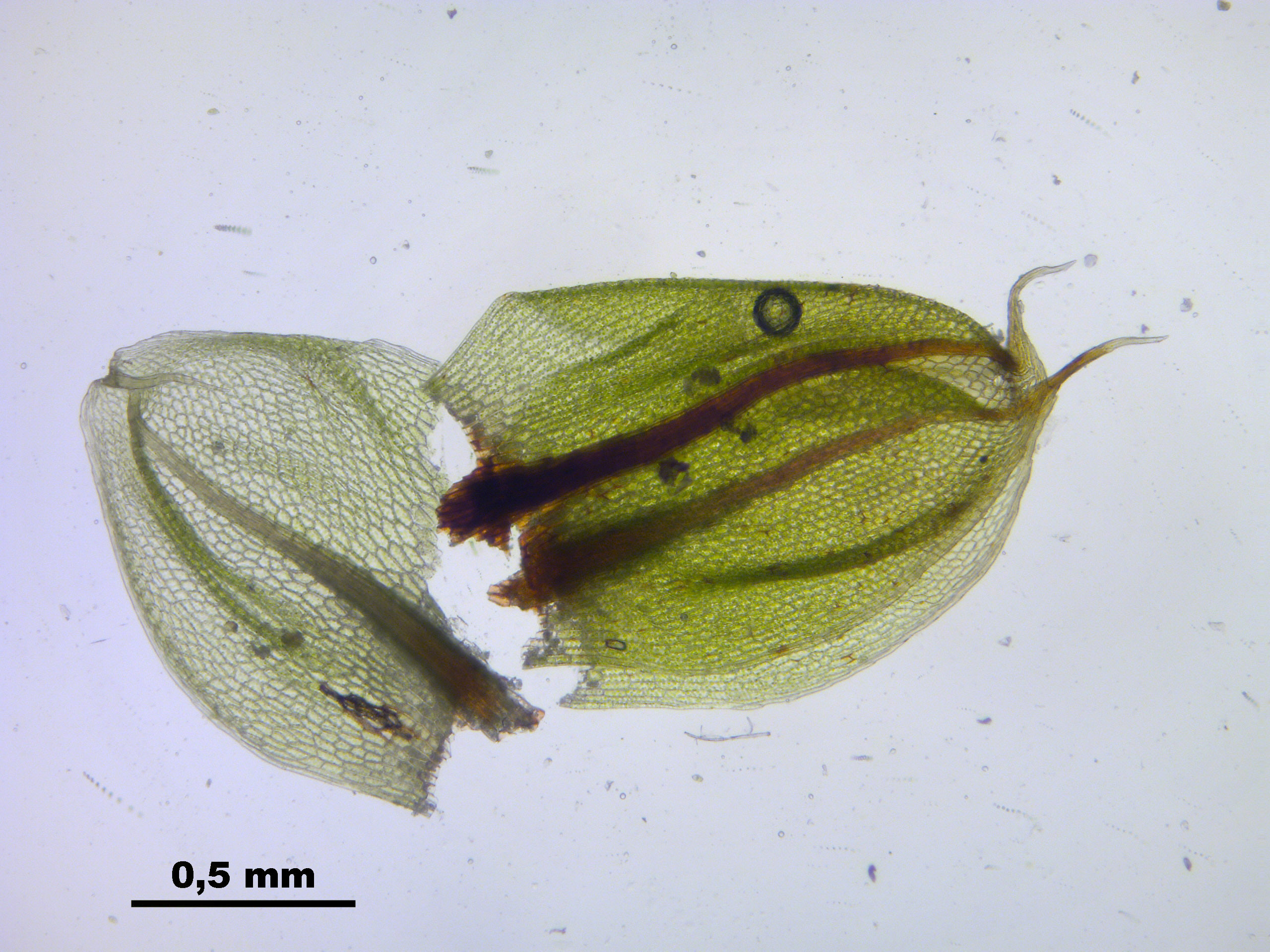
Leaves

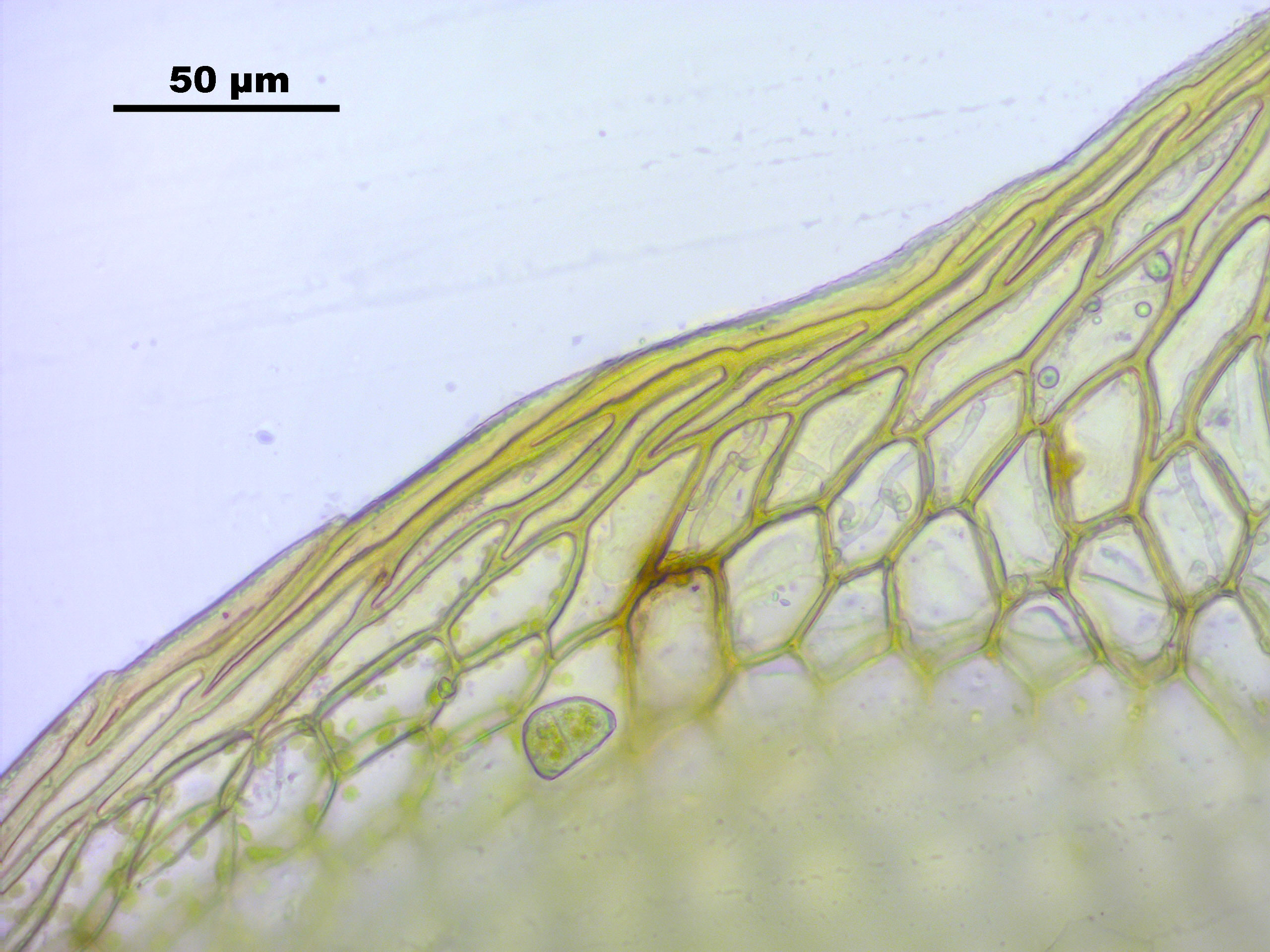
Cells
