= Alexander Dickson (botanist) =

Scottish botanist (1836 – 1887)

Alexander Dickson FRSE
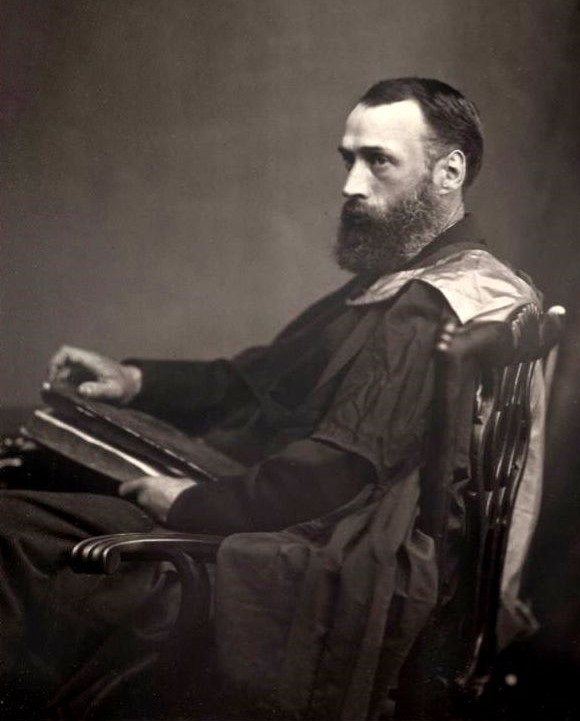
- Born: 21 February 1836; Edinburgh
- Died: 30 December 1887 (aged 51); Hartree, Peeblesshire
- Education: University of Edinburgh
- Occupation: Botanist

Alexander Dickson FRSE LLD (21 February 1836 – 30 December 1887) was a Scottish morphological botanist and botanical artist.

His family had previously had members in the legal and medical professions; one of the earliest of whom any special records exist having been John Dickson of Kilbucho and Hartree, a lawyer, who in 1649 was appointed a Senator of the College of Justice, taking the title of Lord Hartree.

== Early life ==
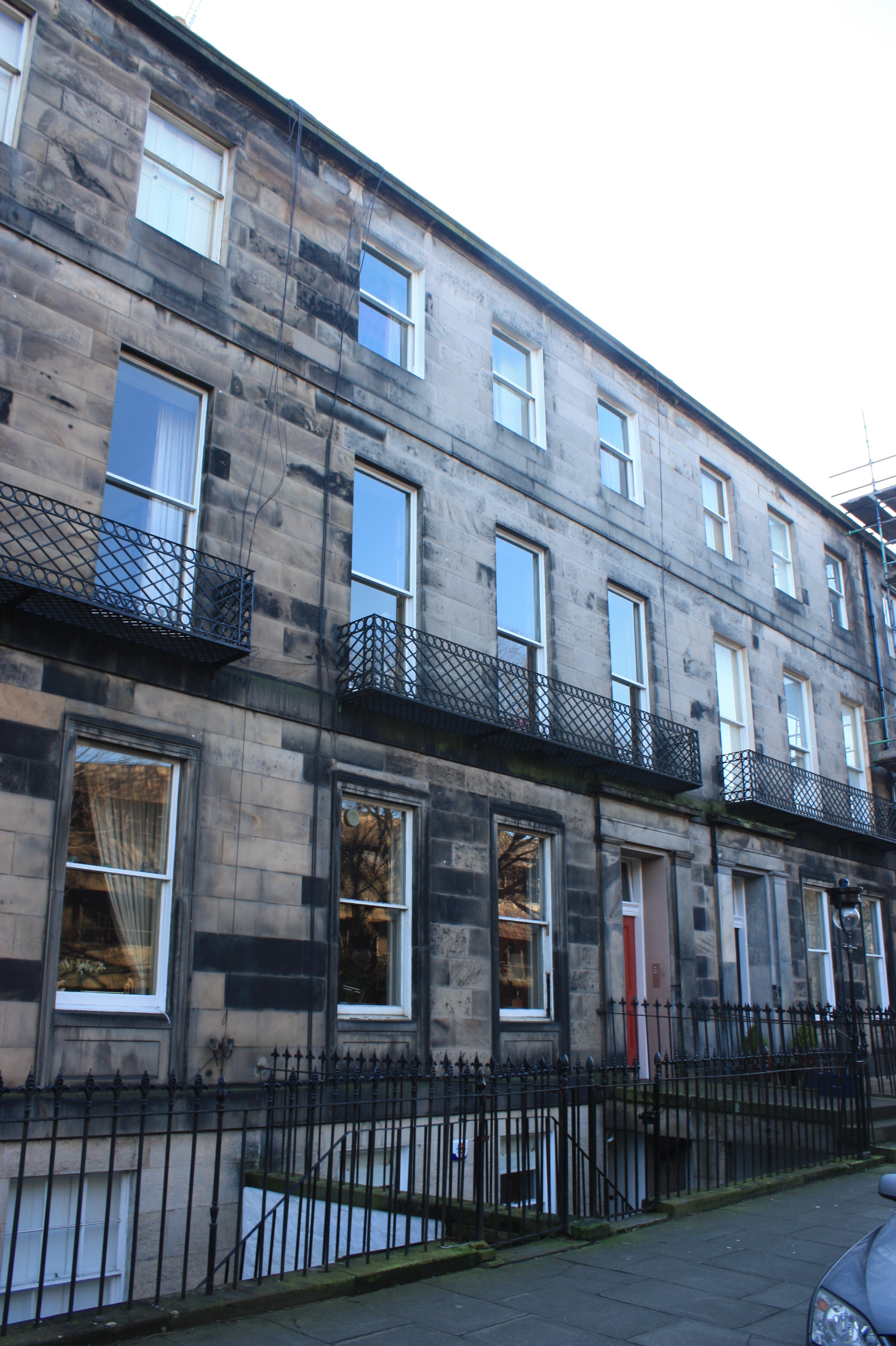
Dickson's house at 6 Fettes Row, Edinburgh

He was born at 6 Fettes Row in Edinburgh on 21 February 1836 the son of Jemima Pyper, daughter of the Rev David Pyper, and David Dickson of Hartree, an advocate, and descendant of John Dickson, Lord Hartree.

Dickson received his early education at home. In 1855, he entered the University of Edinburgh as a student of medicine; and soon engaged with enthusiasm in those preliminary scientific studies which have so frequently been the occasion of the first awakenings of latent scientific impulses. In him they appear to have served this purpose. He became an enthusiastic biologist; and a warm admirer and disciple of Goodsir, in whose philosophical tendencies he found, like many of his friends, the inspiring direction that soon became so marked and characteristic a feature of his scientific work and aims. Engrossed in natural science, he took, it would seem, comparatively little interest in the purely professional or technical departments of the medical curriculum. He, however, appreciated differentiation as a means of promoting advancement in the art as well as in the science of medicine. In his inaugural address, delivered in 1859, as a President of the Royal Medical Society, he supposes the questions,

"Of what use is it for a student of medicine to know that the cranium is composed of vertebral elements—that such and such bones of the face correspond to costal arches; and that certain bones and muscles of the upper extremities correspond to other bones and muscles in the lower?

Why should" his "memory be burdened with apophysis and epiphysis, when" there is "so much else to be learned of more direct importance ?" And he goes on, —" To such objections it may be answered, that although morphological anatomy in its present state may be of little practical importance to the medical man, yet this is no reason why he should not study it. It must be at once apparent that, from the nature of homological anatomy, one of the great ends which it is destined to accomplish is a simplified teaching of descriptive anatomy, by a logical and intelligible arrangement and generalisation of the enormous mass of facts with which the anatomical student has to contend; and this can only be attained to by the development and perfecting of homological anatomy, by which alone a philosophical classification of anatomical details can be rendered possible. Such being the case, all doubt as to the utility of homological anatomy must be thrown aside. Its study must surely be of importance, if it enables anyone to assist, however slightly, in promoting so good an end. The medical man, while he performs his duties to his suffering fellow-creatures, ought never to forget at the same time what he owes to medical science and to posterity."

Dickson graduated as doctor of medicine in August 1860 with his thesis on 'On the development of the flower, and especially the pistil in the caryophyllaceae', having previously, in accordance with his biological proclivities, studied under Albert von Kölliker in Würzburg and Rudolf Virchow in Berlin. His career as a teacher of botany began in the summer of 1862, when he conducted the class of botany in the University of Aberdeen for Professor George Dickie, who was at the time incapacitated by bad health. He thus found an opportunity for displaying his merits as a teacher; and his success proved of much value in securing for him in 1866 the chair of Botany at Trinity College Dublin. Two years afterwards he was appointed Professor of Botany in the University of Glasgow, where he confirmed his early reputation as a clear and painstaking teacher and an enthusiastic worker in structural and morphological botany.

== Career as botanist ==
Dr Dickson remained in Glasgow from 1866 till 1879. In the latter year, the professorship of botany in the University of Edinburgh became vacant, on the resignation, caused by failing health, of the renowned and veteran Professor John Hutton Balfour; and to this great botanical position, Dr Dickson was promoted by the Curators. In the following year, he received from the Crown also the appointment of Regius Professor of Botany to the University of Edinburgh, as well as that of the 8th Regius Keeper of the Royal Botanic Garden, a position he held until 1887. During this time he lived at 11 Royal Circus in the New Town.

It is with his work as a professor in Edinburgh that the members of this Society are most familiar. The recollection of that work is still so vividly present among us, that, but for the requirement of a historical record, it would be needless to dwell on it. We find him entering on his duties imbued with the same conception of the far-reaching affinities between science and art or practice as was recognised in the early developments of his biological career. In his inaugural address he adopted for his subject the consideration of some remarkable parallels between the animal and vegetable kingdoms as regards specialisation of form for the performance of different functions. For this purpose he compared a flowering plant with a zoophyte, and showed how unity of organisation is manifest throughout nature. The same lesson was indicated as, 20 years before, he had taught in his inaugural address to the Royal Medical Society, that the cultivation of every department of biological science increases the knowledge'of that human anatomy which is the foundation of the art of medicine and surgery.

He developed positive relations with the students at the university. He was known for his careful preparation for lectures and for producing detailed botanical illustrations on the blackboard to support his teaching, which contributed to his popularity among students.

Professor Dickson's first botanical paper was published in 1857, while he was yet a student of medicine. During the following 29 years his activity as a worker was shown by the publication of upwards of 50 papers. Many of them rank as masterpieces of accurate and elaborate description, and of philosophical conceptions of structure. A glance over the appended list shows his great partiality for subjects bearing on development and morphology, in which departments of botany he acquired the position of an eminent authority. In confirmation of these statements, it is sufficient to cite his graduation thesis, for which he was bestowed a gold medal, " On the Development of the Flower, and especially the Pistil, in the Caryophyllocece," and his papers on the Morphology of the Reproductive Organs of the Ooniferce, on the Embryo and its Appendages in Tropceolum, on the Embryology and Development of the Flower of Pinguicula, on the Spiral Arrangements of the Cones of Pinus pinaster, and on the Morphology and Structure of the Pitchers in Cephalotus and Nepenthes.

On account of his eminence as a botanist and teacher, he was made honorary MD of the University of Dublin, LLD of the University of Glasgow, Fellow of the Linnaean Society, and President of the Botanical Society of Edinburgh. In 1887 he was elected a member of the Harveian Society of Edinburgh.

He was affiliated with the Botanical Society of Edinburgh. He attended its meetings, served it as president and in some of its other offices, and communicated to it the greater number of his botanical papers.

Dickson took much interest in matters outside of his immediate professorial duties and scientific pursuits. He was a Conservative in State and Church politics. On various occasions he actively supported candidates for parliamentary representation. A consistent Free Churchman, he remained true to the original position of that Church, and opposed publicly the policy which an influential majority had adopted, of reversing its traditions on the question of a State-recognised and supported Church. He strenuously opposed the legislative attempts, which fortunately proved abortive, to modify the special characters of medical education and graduation in the Scottish universities, for the mere sake of bringing them into harmony with the systems prevailing in the southern division of the United Kingdom. He looked with much distrust on the schemes, embodied in the various Bills introduced into Parliament during the last seven years, for effecting fundamental changes in the constitution and character of the Scottish universities; considering them prompted more by political, social, and selfish aims, than by a real and disinterested desire for educational reform. If it were possible for one so charitable and generous to entertain any feeling of resentment, that feeling was approached in the indignation with which he regarded many of the statements of the extreme section of agitators for university legislation. Even when he found himself in a hopeless minority,—as occasionally happened in the discussions on this question,—few men could be more courageous in maintaining or expressing the views he had deliberately adopted.

Polemical discussion, however, was not congenial to his fair and candid disposition. When not engaged in teaching or in the botanical investigations to which he was so ardently attached, his occupations as proprietor of Hartree and Kilbucho, and social intercourse with his friends, were more in accordance with his tastes.

As a country laird, "his one aim in life was to make others happy." The same characteristics made him also a general favourite in society; where he used to delight his friends by the exquisite taste and feeling with which he played on the piano the works of Beethoven and Bach, and the national airs of Scotland.

== Death ==
He was aware that he was suffering from an illness, but concealed this knowledge. He died on 30 December 1887 on the curling pond, at Thriepland Pond, Hartree, Peeblesshire.

== Memorials ==
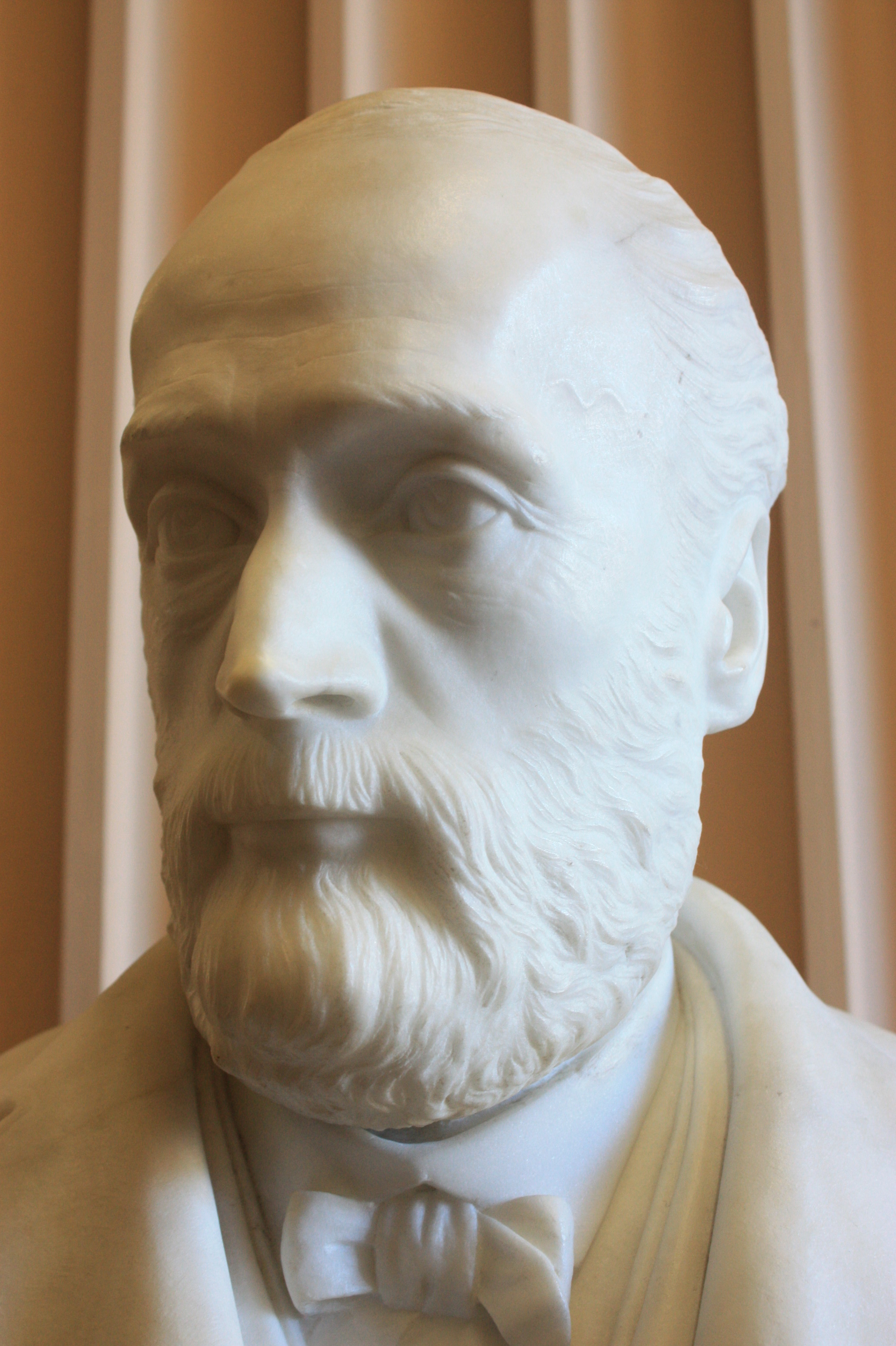
Bust of Alexander Dickson by Charles McBride (1889) Old College, University of Edinburgh

A bust of Dickson, sculpted by Charles McBride in 1889, is held in the art collection of the University of Edinburgh.

== Artistic recognition ==
His sketch portrait of 1884, by William Brassey Hole, is held by the Scottish National Portrait Gallery.

== Chronological list of scientific papers ==
- On a Monstrosity in the Fruit of Silene inflata, with some Remarks on Placentation. Trans. Sot. Soc. Edin., v., 1857.
- On the Compound Nature of the Cormophyte. Trans. Bot. Soc. Edin., vi., 1858; Edin. New Phil. Jour., 1858.
- Remarks on the Development of the Seed-Vessel of Caryophyllaceae. Trans. Bot. Soc. Edin, vi., 1859. (The substance of this paper forms part of the author's graduation thesis, " On the Development of the Flower, and especially the Pistil, in the Caryophyllacece.")
- Observations on some Bisexual Cones occurring in the Spruce Fir (Abies excelsa). Trans. Bot. Soc. Edin., vi., 1860; Edin. New Phil. Jour., 1860; Adawonia, ii.
- Translation of Baillon's Organogenic Researches on the Female Flower of the Coniferaa. Trans. Bot. Soc. Edin., vii., 1861.
- Note upon the preceding Translation, with Observations upon the Morphological Constitution of certain Abietineous Cones. Trans. Bot. Soc. Edin., vii., 1861; Edin. New Phil. Jour., 1861; Adansonia, ii.
- On some of the Stages of Development in the Female Flowers of Dammara australis. Ibid. Observations on the Embryogeny of Tropceolum majus. Trans. Bot. Soc. Edin., vii., 1862; Edin. New Phil. Jour., 1863.
- On Diplostemeuous Flowers, with some Remarks upon the Position of the Carpels in the Malvaceae. Trans. Bot. Soe. Edin., viii., 1864; Edin. New Phil. Jour., 1864; Adansonia, iv.
- Note on the Position of the Carpellary Groups in Malope and Kitaibelia. Trans. Bot. Soc. Edin., viii., 1864.
- On the Morphological Constitution of the Androecium of Menizelia, and its analogy with that of certain Rosaceae. Trans. Bot. Soc. Edin., viii., 1865; Seeman's Jour, of Bot., iii., 1865.
- Opening Address to the Botanical Society of Edinburgh for Session 1865–6. Trans. Bot. Soc. Edin., viii, 1865.
- On the Phylloid Shoots of Sciadopitys verticillata, Sieb. and Zucc. (Read before the Botanical Congress, London, 1866.) Seeman's Jour, of Bot, iv., 1866.
- On the Staminal Arrangements in some Species of Potentilla and in Nuttallia cerasiformis. Trans. Bot. Soc. Edin., viii., 1866; Jour, of Bot., iv., 1866.
- On Abnormal Flowers in Tropceolum majus. Trans. Bot. Sue. Edin., ix., 1866.
- Notice of an Abnormal Leaf of Primus Laurocerasus. Jour, of Bot., v., 1867.
- On some of the Principal Modifications of the Receptacle, and their Relation to the " Insertion" of the Leaf-organs of the Flower. Report Brit. Assoc., 1868.
- On the Development of the Flower of Pinguicvla vtdgaris, L., with Remarks on the Embryos of P. vulgaris, P. grandiflora, P. lusitanica, P. eaudata, and Utricularia minor. Trans. Roy. Soc. Edin., xxv., 1869; Proc. Roy. Soc. Edin., vi., 1869.
- Note on the Embryo of Ruscus aculeatus. Jour, of Bot., viiL, 1870; Trans. Bot. Soc. Edin., x., 1870.
- Note on the Embryo of Zostera. Ibid. Note on the Embryo of the Date Palm. Ibid. Ou the Phyllotaxis of Lepidodendron and Knorria. Jour, of Bot., ix, 1871; Trans. Bot. Soc. Edin., Xl, 1871.
- Notice of Exhibition of Vegetable Spirals (chiefly Fir Cones and Cacti). Proc. Roy. Soc. Edin., vii., 1871. On some Abnormal Cones of Pinut Pinaster. Trans. Roy. Soc. Edin., xzvi., 1871.
- Suggestions on Fruit-classification. Jour, of Bot., ix., 1871.
- Note on Germination of Delphinium. Ibid., x., 1872.
- On Consanguineous Marriages viewed in the light of Comparative Physiology, &c. Introductory Lecture delivered at the Opening of the Medical Session, 1871–2, in the University of Glasgow. Glasg. Med. Jour., N.S. iv., 1872.
- Note on Stigmarice from the Fossiliferous Strata at Auchentorlie. Report Brit. Assoc., 1872. * Note on an Abnormality of Chrysantltemum LeitcantJiemum. Nature, x.; Report Brit. Assoc., 1874.
- Note on an Abnormality of Primula vidgaris, with Interpretaline Lobes. Report Brit. Assoc., 1875; Trans. Bot. Soc. Edin., XIL, 1875.
- Note on a Monstrosity of Saxifraga stellaris. Ibid.
- On the Embryogeny of Tropteolum peregrinum, L., and Tropaeolum speciosum, Endl. and Peep. Trans. Roy. Soc. Edin., xxvii., 1875.
- Note on Two Monstrosities of Matricaria inodora. Report Brit. Assoc., 1876.
- Note on Laticif erous Canals in Fruit of Limnocharis Plumieri. Ibid. Note of Exhibition of Specimen of Pogonatum alpinum with two Capsules under one Calyptra. Ibid.
- On the Structure of the Pitcher of Cephalotus follicularis. Jour, of Bot., xvi., 1878. Note on the Stipules of Spergiilaria marina. Report Brit. Assoc., 1878; Jour, of Bot., xvi., 1878.
- Note on the Inflorescence of Senebiera didyma. Ibid.
- Note on the Six-celled Glands of Cephalotus, and their Similarity to the Glands of Sarracmia purpurea. Ibid. Note on Exhibition of Specimens of Isoeten echinospora. Report Brit. Assoc., 1878. On Functional Specialisation of Individuals in Animals and Plants, with particular reference to Analogies between the Sertularian Zoophyte and the Flowering Plant. Trans. Bot. Soc. Edin xiii., 1879.
- On the Morphology of the Pitcher of Cephalotus follicularis. Jovr. of Bot., xix., 1881; Gardeners' Chronicle, 1881.
- On the Septa across the Ducts in Bougainvillea glabra and Testudinaria elephantipes. Trans. Bot. Soc. Edin., xiv., 1879.
- On the Germination of Podophyllum Emodi. Trans. But. Soc. Edin., xvi., 1882; Gardeners' Chronicle, 1882.
- On a Plant of Primula vulgaris with a Green Corolla. Trans. Bot. Soc. Edin., xiv., 1882.
- On a Monstrosity in the Flower of Iris Pseudaeorus. Ibid.; Gardeners' Chronicle, 1882, pt. 2.
- On the Germination of Streptocarpiu caulescens. Traru. Bot. Soc. Edin., xiv., 1882.
- On the Structure of the Pitcher in the Seedling of Nepenthes, as compared with that in the Adult Plant. Gardeners' Chronicle, xx., 1883; Proe. Roy. Soc. Edin., xii., 1883–4.
- Note on Hybrid Hedychiums. Ibid., xxii., 1884.
- On the ^Estivation of the Floral Envelopes of Helianthemum vulgare. Trans. Bot. Soc. Edin., xiv., 1883.
- On the Occurrence of Foliage-leaves in Ruscus (Semele) androgynus; with some Structural and Morphological Observations. Gardeners' Chronicle, 1883; Trans. Bot. Soc. Edin., xvi, 1883.
- On the Development of Bifoliar Spurs into Ordinary Buds in Pinus Sylvestris. Trans. Bot. Soc. Edin., xvi., 1885; Gardeners' Chronicle, 1885.
- On Certain Points in the Morphology of Frtdlania and some other Leafy Jungermanuiese. Trans. Bot. Soc. Edin, xvi., 1886.
