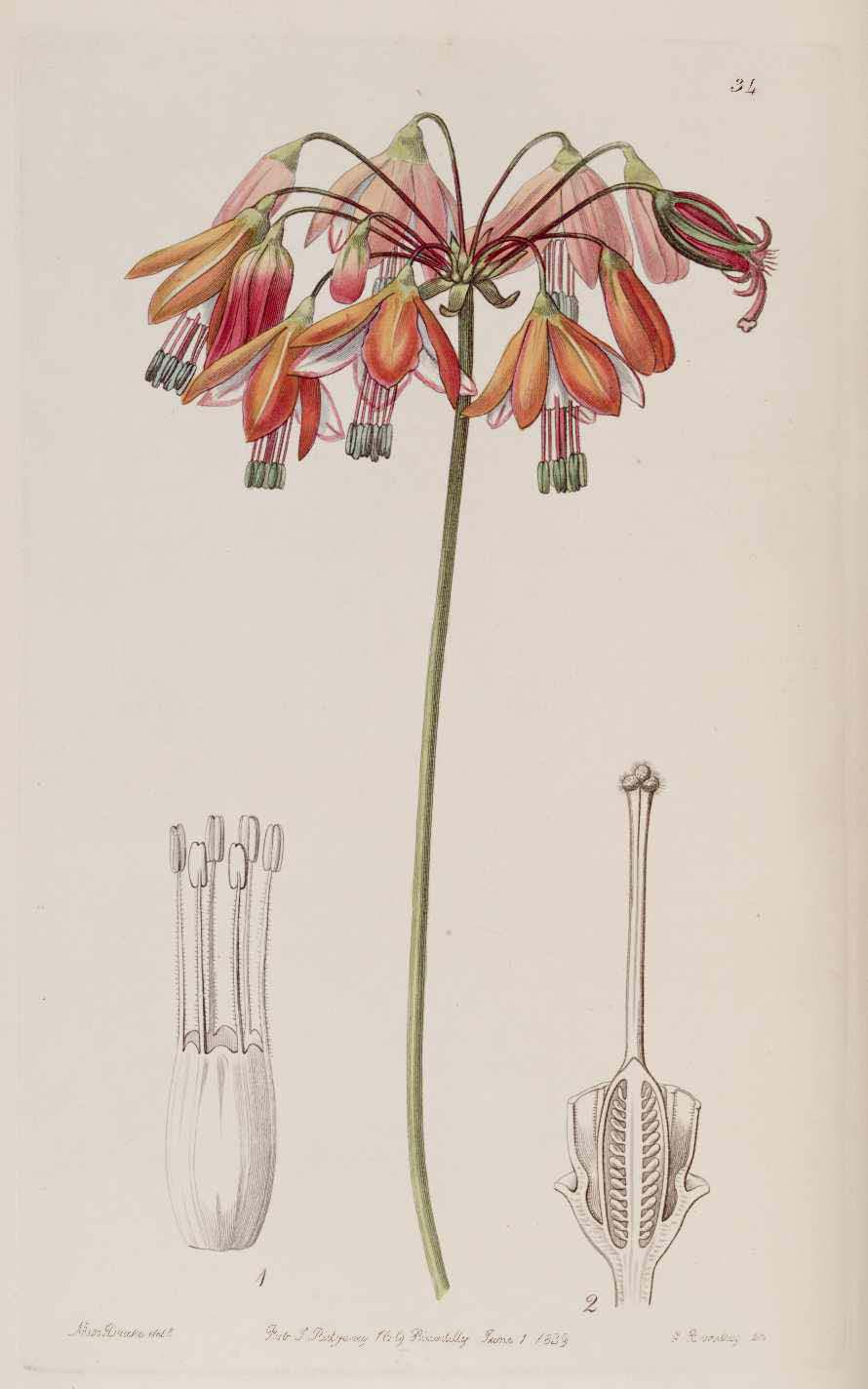
- Bessera elegans 1839 illustration

Scientific classification
- Kingdom: Plantae
- Clade: Tracheophytes
- Clade: Angiosperms
- Clade: Monocots
- Order: Asparagales
- Family: Asparagaceae
- Subfamily: Brodiaeoideae
- Genus: Bessera; Schult.f. 1829, conserved name not Schult. 1809 (Boraginaceae) nor Spreng. 1815 (Putranjivaceae) nor Vell. 1825 (Nyctaginaceae)

Synonyms
- Pharium Herb.

= Bessera =

Genus of flowering plants

Bessera is a genus of Mexican plants in the cluster lily subfamily within the asparagus family. It is a small genus of 5 known species of mostly herbaceous flowering plants with corms. They have flowers with petals and petaloid sepals (tepals) with compound pistils.

The genus is named for Austrian and Russian botanist Wilibald Swibert Joseph Gottlieb von Besser (1784–1842).

Bessera elegans, called coral drops, is cultivated and is a half-hardy Mexican herbaceous plant growing from corms with drooping terminal umbels of showy red-and-white colored flowers.

== Taxonomy ==
=== Species ===
Plants of the World Online currently accepts four species:

- Bessera elegans Schult.f. — central to southern Mexico.
- Bessera elegantissima E.Gándara, Ortiz-Brunel, Art.Castro & Ruiz-Sanchez
- Bessera ramirezii E.Gándara, Ortiz-Brunel, Art.Castro & Ruiz-Sanchez
- Bessera tuitensis R.Delgad. — Jalisco state in coastal southwestern Mexico.

=== Former species ===
Some species formerly placed in Bessera have been reclassified to other genera, including Androstephium, Drypetes, Flueggea, Guapira, and Pulmonaria.
Former species include:

- Bessera azurea — Pulmonaria angustifolia
- Bessera breviflora — Androstephium breviflorum
- Bessera calycantha — Guapira opposita
- Bessera inermis — Flueggea virosa
- Bessera spinosa — Drypetes alba
- Bessera tenuiflora (Greene) J.F.Macbr. — Behria tenuiflora Greene
