= Narrow-leaved lungwort =

Narrow-leaved lungwort is a common name for two plants in the genus Pulmonaria:

- Pulmonaria angustifolia, native to central and north eastern Europe
- Pulmonaria longifolia, native to western Europe
