= Coleophora pulmonariella =

Scientific classification
- Kingdom: Animalia
- Phylum: Arthropoda
- Class: Insecta
- Order: Lepidoptera
- Family: Coleophoridae
- Genus: Coleophora
- Species: C. pulmonariella

Binomial name
- Coleophora pulmonariella Ragonot, 1874

Species of moth

Coleophora pulmonariella is a moth of the family Coleophoridae. It is found from Sweden and northern Russia to the Pyrenees and Italy, and from France to Romania.

The larvae feed on Myosotis palustris, Myosotis sylvatica, Pulmonaria mollissima, Pulmonaria obscura, Pulmonaria officinalis, Symphytum officinale and Symphytum tuberosum.
