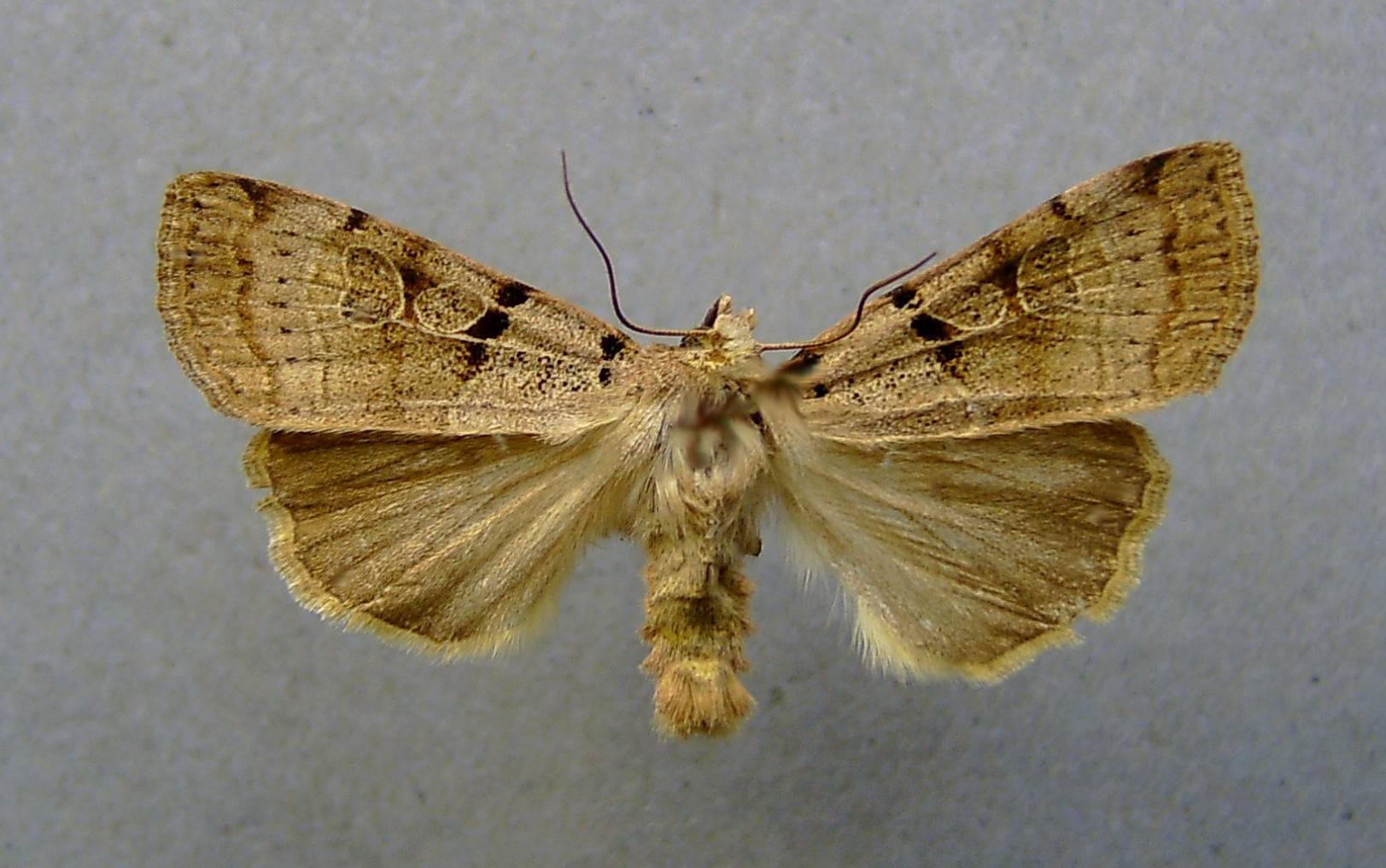

Scientific classification
- Kingdom: Animalia
- Phylum: Arthropoda
- Class: Insecta
- Order: Lepidoptera
- Superfamily: Noctuoidea
- Family: Noctuidae
- Genus: Eugnorisma
- Species: E. depuncta

Binomial name
- Eugnorisma depuncta (Linnaeus, 1761)

Synonyms
- Rhyacia depuncta; Agrotis depuncta; Phalaena depuncta

= Eugnorisma depuncta =

Species of moth

Eugnorisma depuncta, the plain clay, is a moth of the family Noctuidae. The species was first described by Carl Linnaeus in 1761. It is found in most of Europe, west to England, north to Scotland and Fennoscandia, south to southern France, Italy, Sicily and Greece, east up to the Caucasus. It is not present in northern France, the Benelux or parts of western Germany.

The wingspan is 34–44 mm. Meyrick describes it thus: Antennae in male ciliated. Forewings light ochreous-brown; subbasal line anteriorly black-edged; first line black-edged posteriorly except towards dorsum; second partly dark-edged, on costa anteriorly blackish-edged; orbicular and reniform finely pale-edged, space between them and before orbicular browner; subterminal line anteriorly darker-edged. Hindwings fuscous, darker posteriorly. Larva dull brown; a dorsal series of diamonds darker-outlined; spiracular sufFusedly darker, spiracles white, dark-edged; subspiracular ochreous-whitish; head light brown, darker-marked.

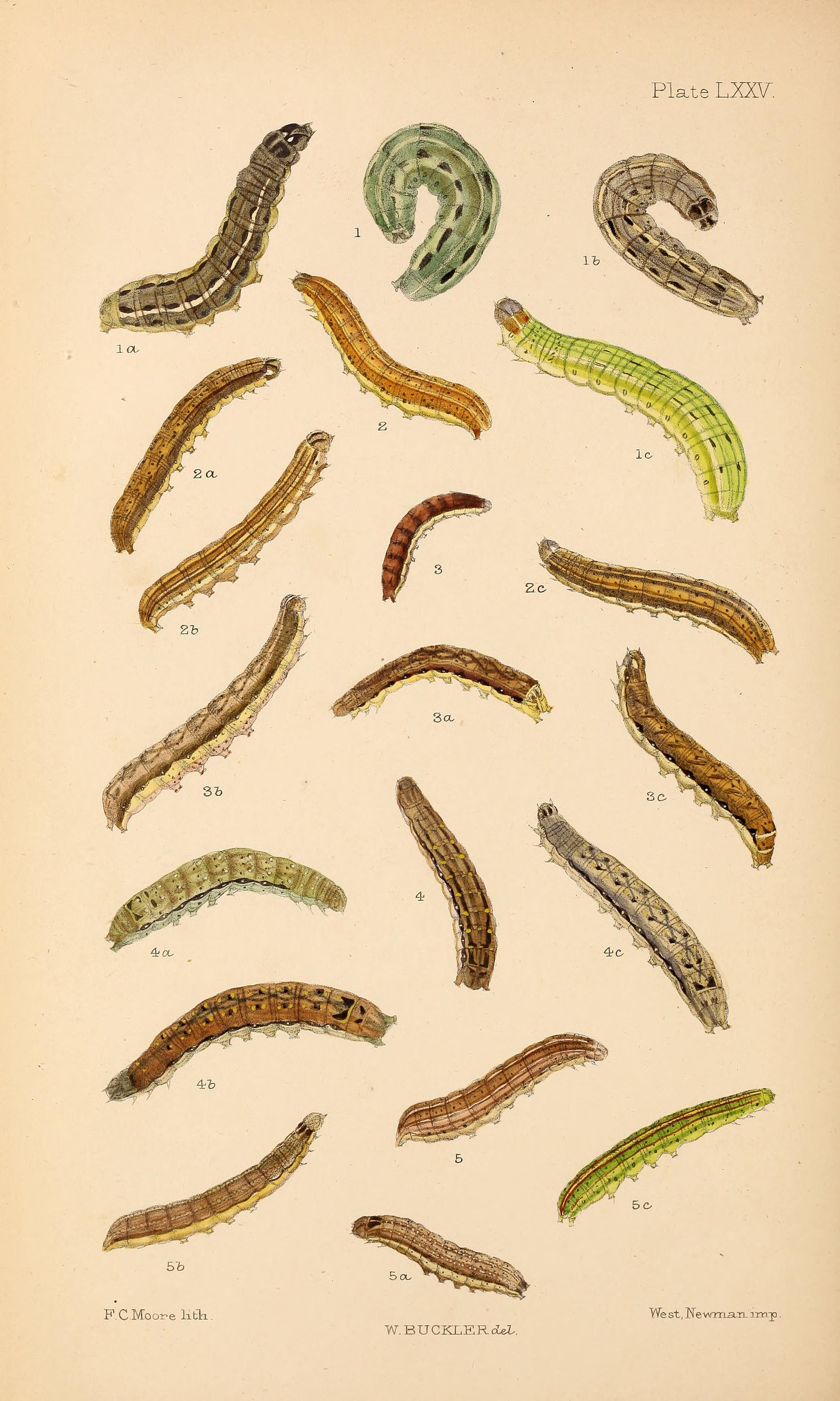
3,3a,3b,3c larva after last moult

Adults are on wing from July to September depending on the location.

The larvae feed on Pulmonaria mollis, Lamium, Vaccinium myrtillus and Urtica dioica.
