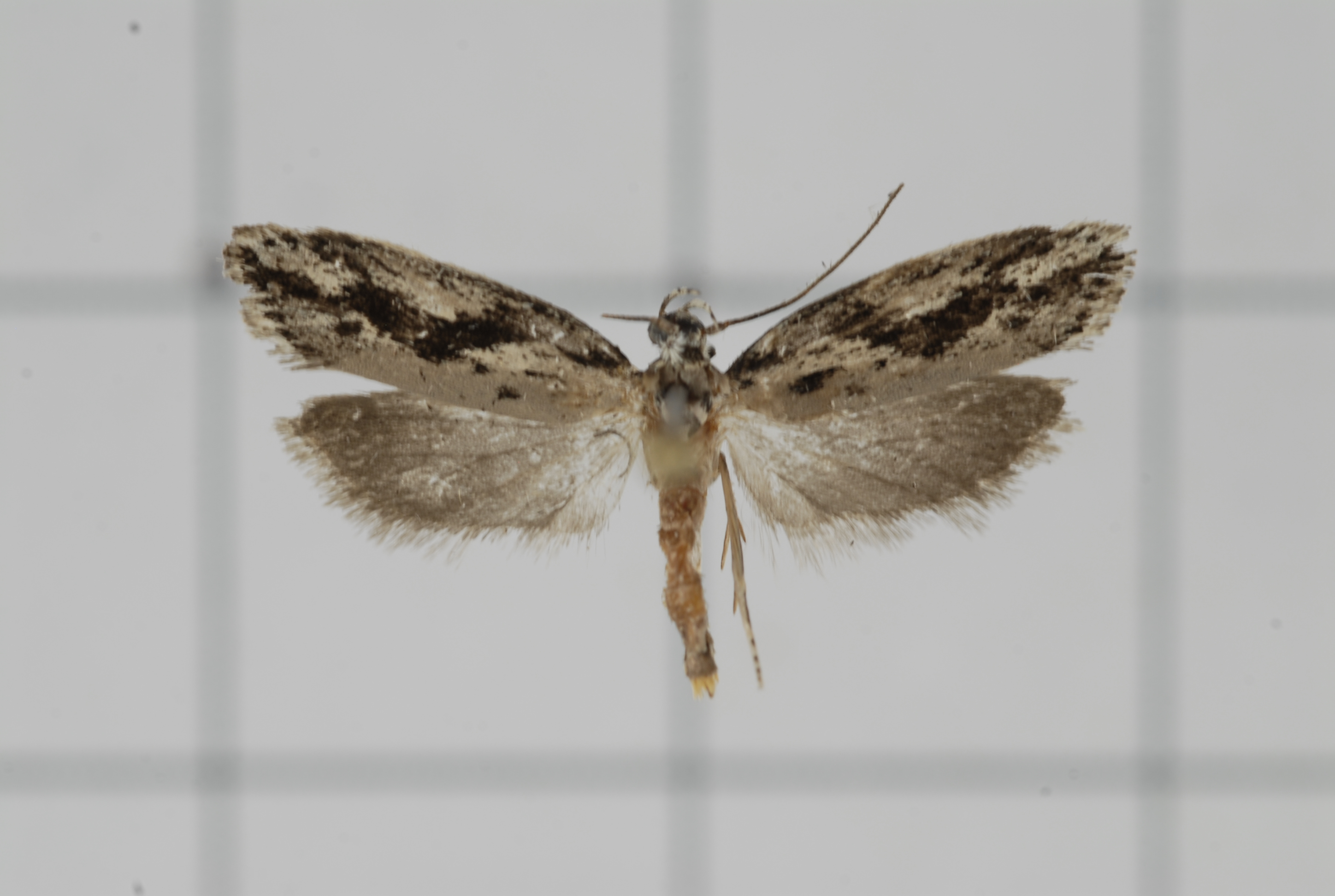

Scientific classification
- Kingdom: Animalia
- Phylum: Arthropoda
- Clade: Pancrustacea
- Class: Insecta
- Order: Lepidoptera
- Family: Depressariidae
- Genus: Ethmia
- Species: E. guangzhouensis

Binomial name
- Ethmia guangzhouensis Y.-Q. Liu, 1980

= Ethmia guangzhouensis =

Species of moth

Ethmia guangzhouensis is a moth in the family Depressariidae. It was described by You-Qiao Liu in 1980. It is found in Guangdong, China.

Adults closely resemble Ethmia fumidella, but can be distinguished by the four black dots on the thorax, the round cucullus and the undeveloped antrum.
