= Mary's tears =

Mary's tears or Our Lady's tears may refer to:

- Pulmonaria officinalis or lungwort
- Lily of the valley or Convallaria majalis
