= P. angustifolia =

P. angustifolia may refer to:

- Populus angustifolia, a cottonwood tree
- Prunus angustifolia, a plum tree
- Pulmonaria angustifolia, a flowering plant
- Pyracantha angustifolia, a flowering plant
