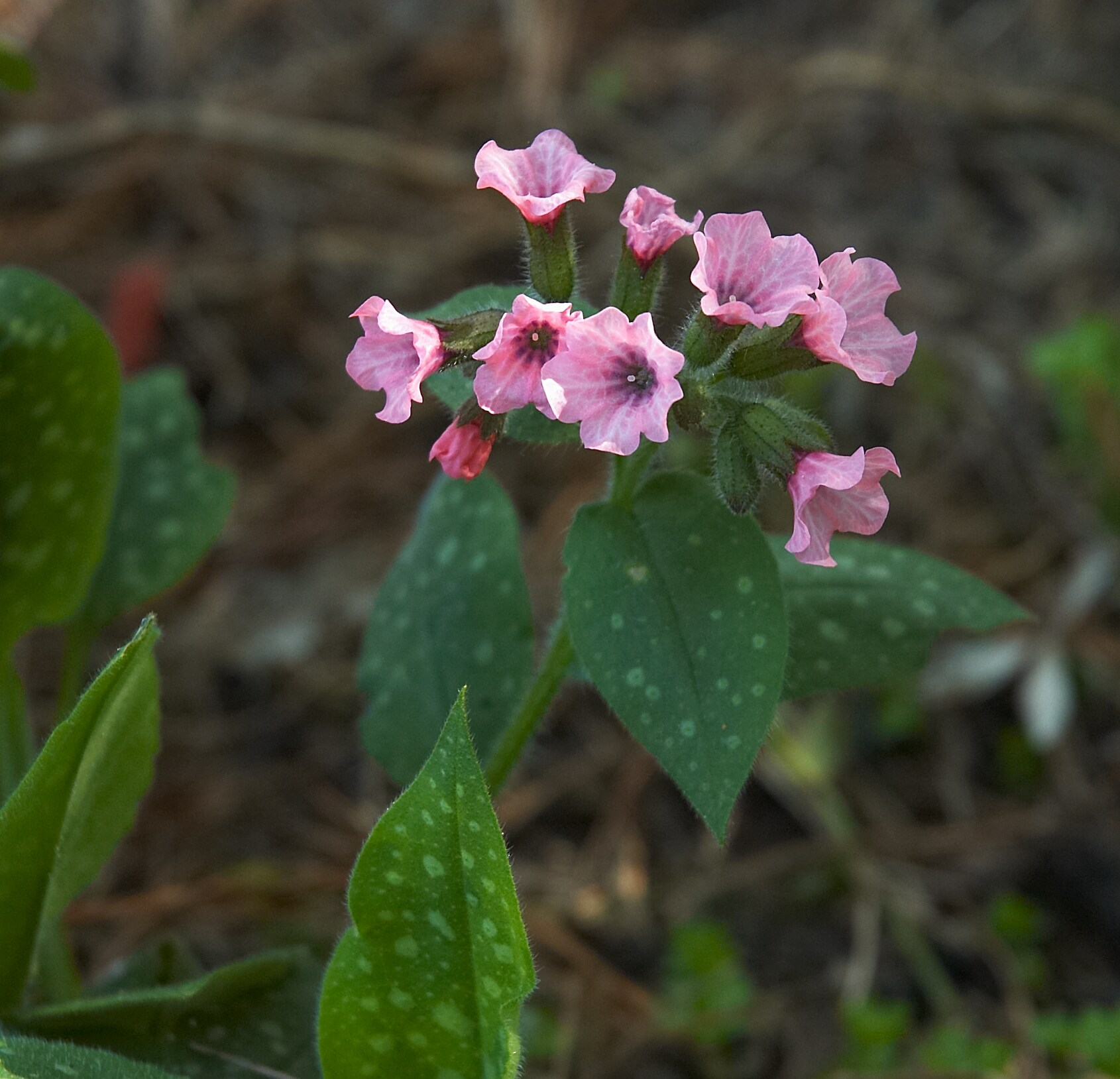

Scientific classification
- Kingdom: Plantae
- Clade: Tracheophytes
- Clade: Angiosperms
- Clade: Eudicots
- Clade: Asterids
- Order: Boraginales
- Family: Boraginaceae
- Genus: Pulmonaria
- Species: P. saccharata

Binomial name
- Pulmonaria saccharata Mill. (1768)

= Pulmonaria saccharata =

Species of flowering plant

Pulmonaria saccharata, the Bethlehem lungwort or Bethlehem sage, is a species of flowering plant in the family Boraginaceae, native to France and Italy. It is a rhizomatous herbaceous perennial which is closely related to the common lungwort (Pulmonaria officinalis). Growing to 10 cm (4 in) tall by 60 cm (24 in) wide, it has lance-shaped leaves with white confluent spots, and pink or white flowers in spring.

The specific epithet saccharata means sugared, and refers to the spotted surface of the leaves.

== Cultivation ==
Pulmonaria saccharata is hardy in all of Europe down to −20 °C (−4 °F). It prefers shaded, nutrient-rich, moist, well-drained soil. Numerous cultivars have been developed, of which the following have gained the Royal Horticultural Society's Award of Garden Merit:-

- Argentea Group
- 'Cotton Cool'
- 'Lewis Palmer'
- 'Sissinghurst White'
