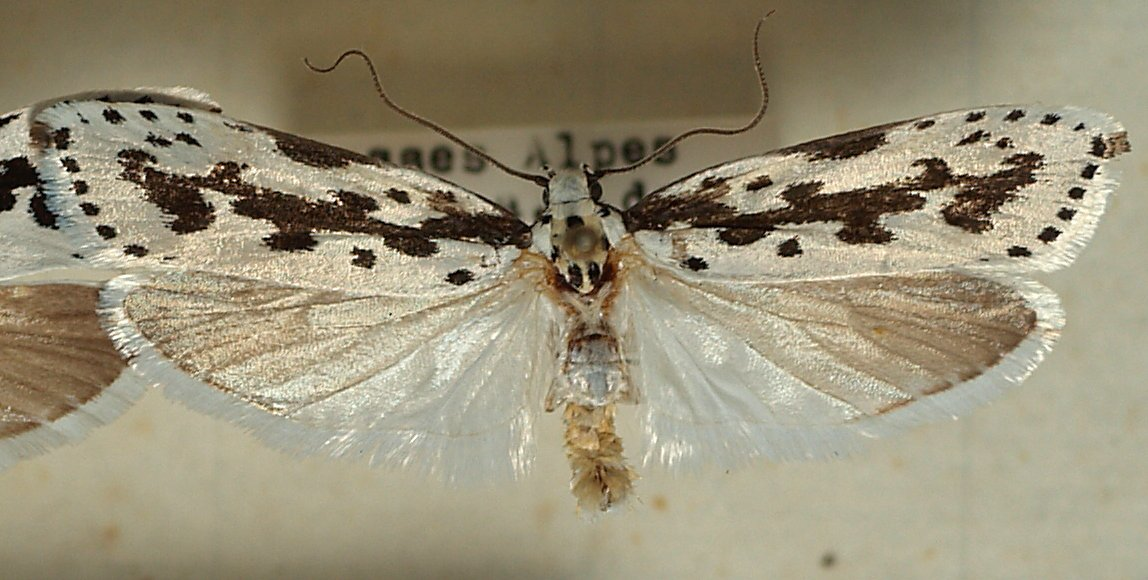

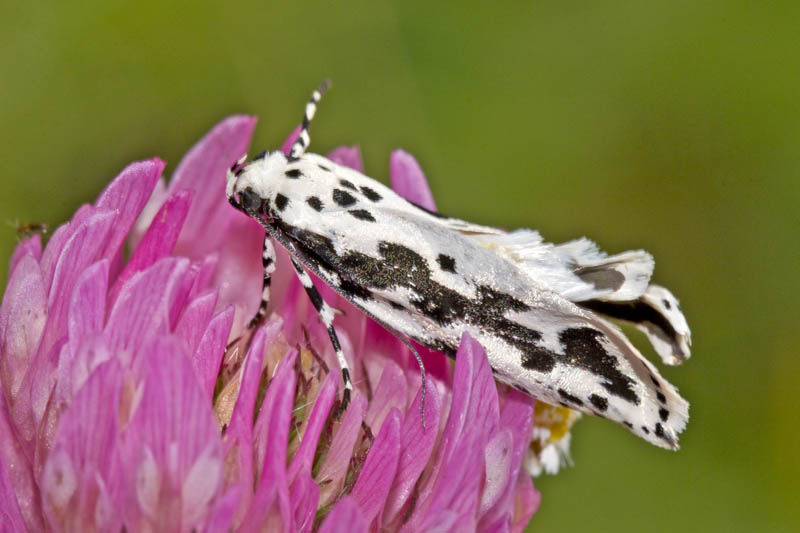

Scientific classification
- Kingdom: Animalia
- Phylum: Arthropoda
- Class: Insecta
- Order: Lepidoptera
- Family: Depressariidae
- Genus: Ethmia
- Species: E. pusiella

Binomial name
- Ethmia pusiella (Linnaeus, 1758)

Synonyms
- Numerous, see text

= Ethmia pusiella =

Species of moth

Ethmia pusiella is a moth of the family Depressariidae. It occurs throughout Europe and eastwards to the Tien Shan mountains of eastern Central Asia.

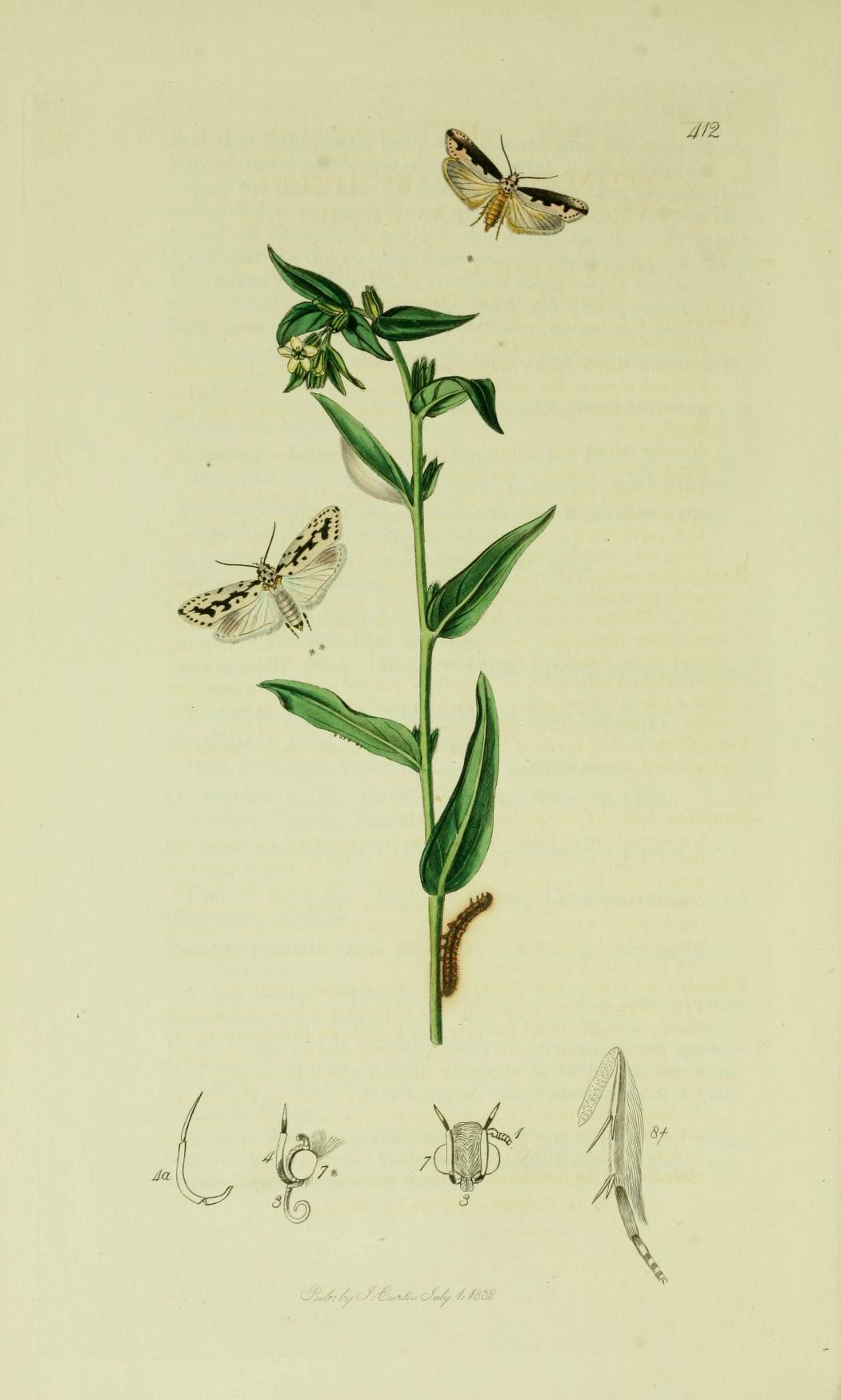
Illustration from John Curtis's British Entomology Volume 6

The wingspan is 19 to 20 millimetres (0.75 to 0.79 in).

The caterpillars feed on common gromwell (Lithospermum officinale) and Pulmonaria officinalis. They have also been recorded to be myrmecophilous.

== Taxonomy and systematics ==
Ethmia pusiella is the type species of the proposed genera Anesychia and Melanoleuca, which are now considered junior synonyms of Ethmia. If considered separate from Ethmia, the senior synonym Anesychia must be used.

Two subspecies are accepted nowadays:

- Ethmia pusiella pusiella – western populations, east to Ural Mountains and Asia Minor
- Ethmia pusiella deletella – eastern populations, Central Asia and Tien Shan

In earlier times, E. candidella and E. fumidella were considered varieties of E. pusiella.

Junior synonyms of E. pusiella are:

- Ethmia deletella de Lattin, 1963
- Ethmia lithospermella (Hübner, 1789)
- Ethmia scalacella (Kühn, 1777)
- Phalaena (Tinea) pusiella Linnaeus, 1758
- Tinea lithospermella Hübner, 1789
- Tinea scalacella Kühn, 1777
