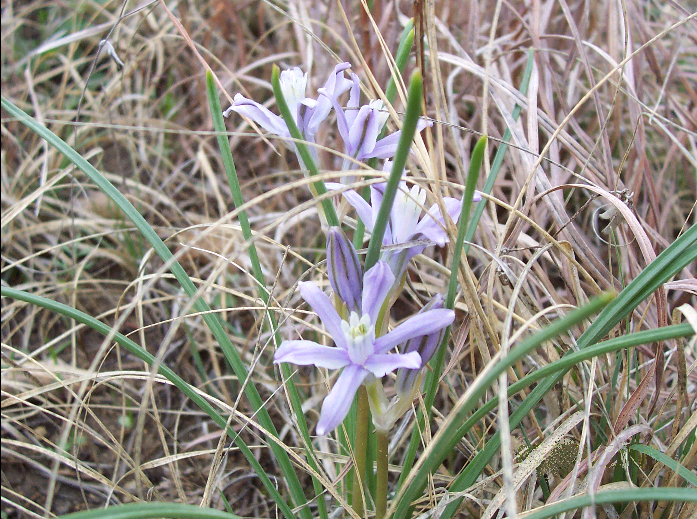
- Androstephium coeruleum

Conservation status
- Apparently Secure (NatureServe)

Scientific classification
- Kingdom: Plantae
- Clade: Embryophytes
- Clade: Tracheophytes
- Clade: Spermatophytes
- Clade: Angiosperms
- Clade: Monocots
- Order: Asparagales
- Family: Asparagaceae
- Subfamily: Brodiaeoideae
- Genus: Androstephium
- Species: A. coeruleum

Binomial name
- Androstephium coeruleum (Scheele) Greene

Synonyms
- Androstephium caeruleum orthographic variant (i.e., misspelling) of A. coeruleum, commonly but erroneously attributed to Torrey; Milla coerulea Scheele; Brodiaea coerulea (Scheele) J.F.Macbr.; Androstephium violaceum Torr.; Androstephium coeruleum f. leucanthum Benke

= Androstephium coeruleum =

Blue funnel lily

Species of flowering plant

Androstephium coeruleum, commonly called blue funnel-lily, is an herbaceous perennial growing from corms. It has light blue to violet purple flowers and grows up to 35 cm tall. It is found growing in prairies and on grassy slopes in its native range within Texas, Oklahoma and Kansas of the United States. It disperses its seed by wind.

== Cultivation and uses ==
The blue funnel lily is among the first of the prairie flowers to bloom - emerging in February and flowering in March in North Central Texas. There is great variability in the shape and color (sky blue to purple to white) of flowers of the species; they have a faint sweet scent described as "grape-like". The plant is uncommon in its habitat, black soil prairie, and nearly impossible to find among the prairie short grasses in which it grows. Fruit set is infrequent - whether due to loss of native pollinators or self-sterility is unknown - and ripens by late April, when it splits open, presenting the thin, flat black seeds to the wind. The seedling manifests itself as a single thin green leaf - very much like a single strand of thick green hair - and is easily lost in the prairie grasses among which it grows. First year growth results in a spherical bulb 4 mm to 5 mm in diameter. Over the course of several years the plant progressively pulls its corm deeper and deeper into the soil until it has reached a depth of 2.5 cm to 6 cm.

The corm was once eaten in West Texas.

== Gallery ==
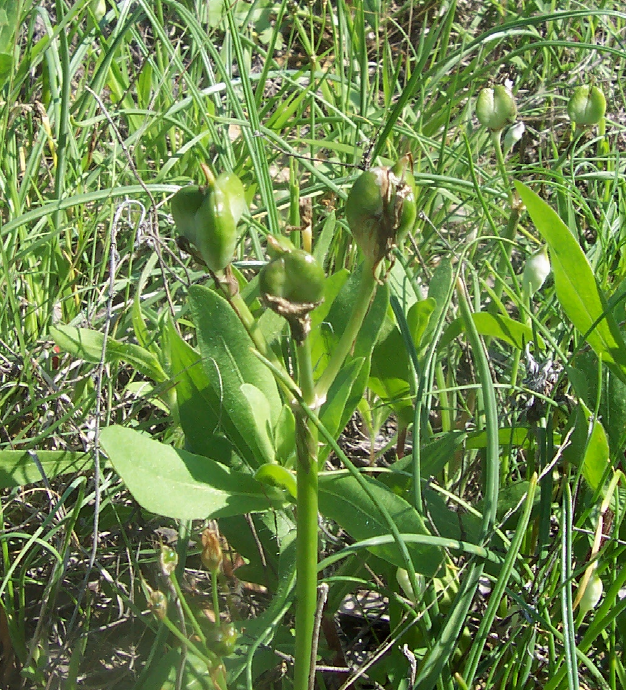
Blue funnel lily developing fruit

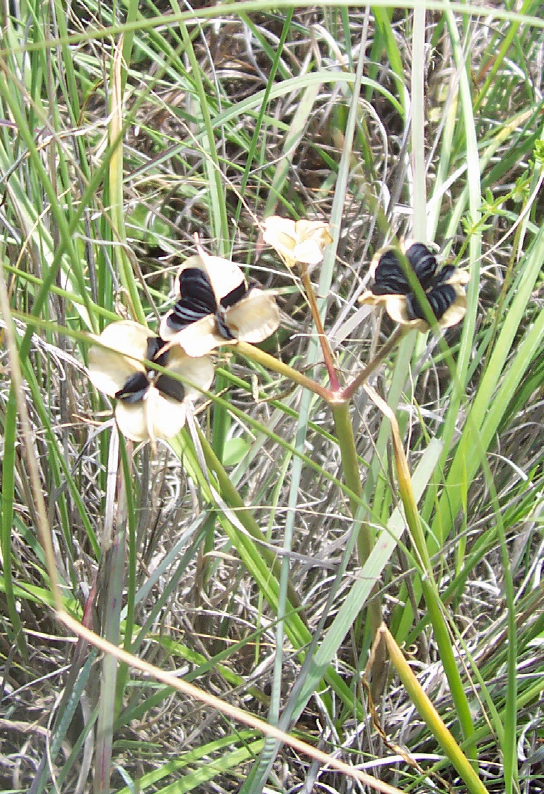
Blue funnel lily dehiscent fruit

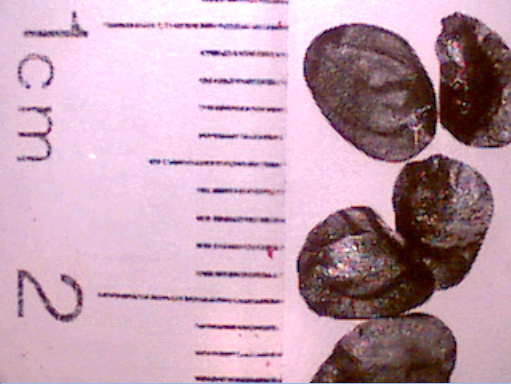
Blue funnel lily seed

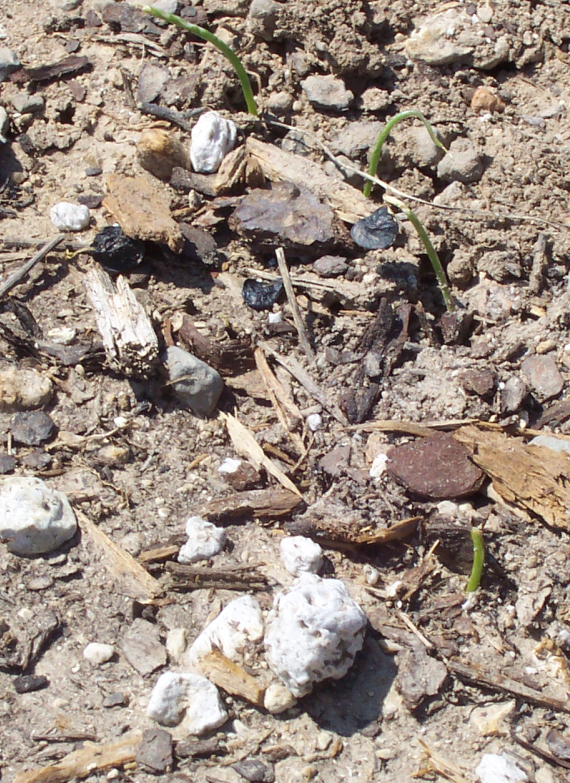
Blue funnel lily seedlings

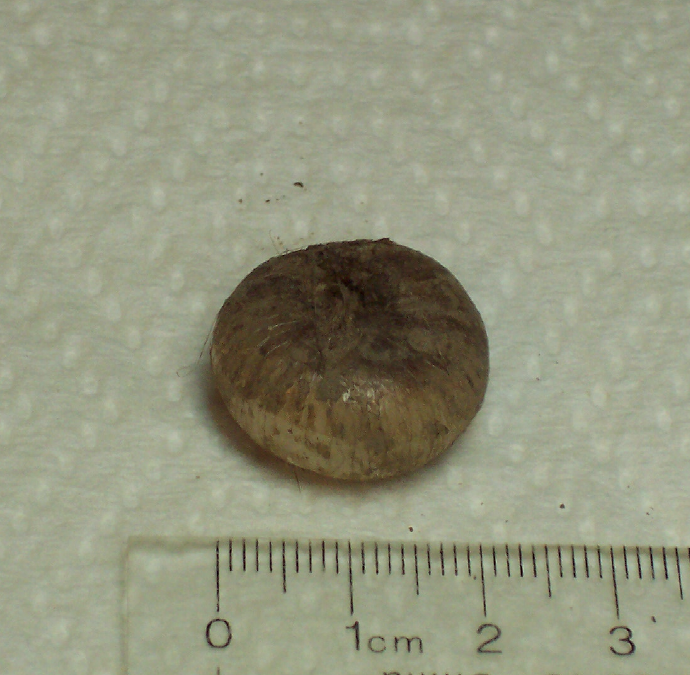
Blue funnel lily corm
