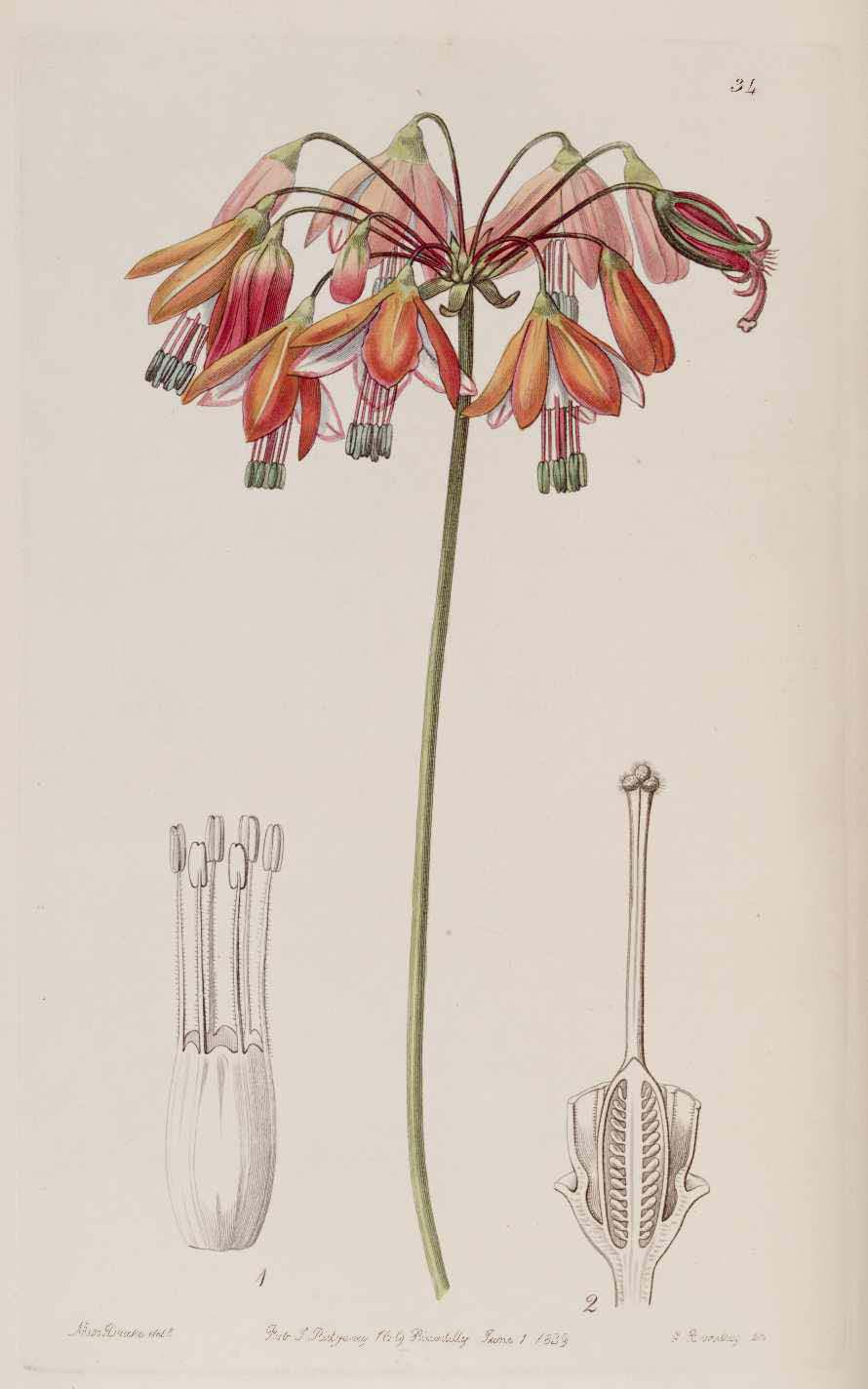
- Bessera elegans 1839 (Artist: Sarah Ann Drake)

Scientific classification
- Kingdom: Plantae
- Clade: Tracheophytes
- Clade: Angiosperms
- Clade: Monocots
- Order: Asparagales
- Family: Asparagaceae
- Subfamily: Brodiaeoideae
- Genus: Bessera
- Species: B. elegans

Binomial name
- Bessera elegans Schult.f. 1829

Synonyms
- Pharium elegans (Schult.f.) Steud., 1841; Bessera fistulosa (Herb.) Pritz., 1854; Bessera herbertii G.Don in R.Sweet, 1839; Bessera miniata Lem. in L.B.Van Houtte, 1848; Bessera multiflora M.Martens & Galeotti, 1842; Pharium fistulosum Herb., 1832; Pharium herbertii (G.Don) Steud., 1841

= Bessera elegans =

Species of flowering plant

Bessera elegans, also known by the common name coral drops, is a cormous herbaceous perennial flowering plant in the family Asparagaceae, from Mexico.

== Description ==
- Height: Up to 70 cm.
- Flowers: Umbels of pendant, showy scarlet-and-white coloured flowers.
- Leaves: Attenuated, erect leaves.

== Distribution ==
Native to central and southern Mexico, B. elegans is also cultivated as an ornamental.

== Gallery ==
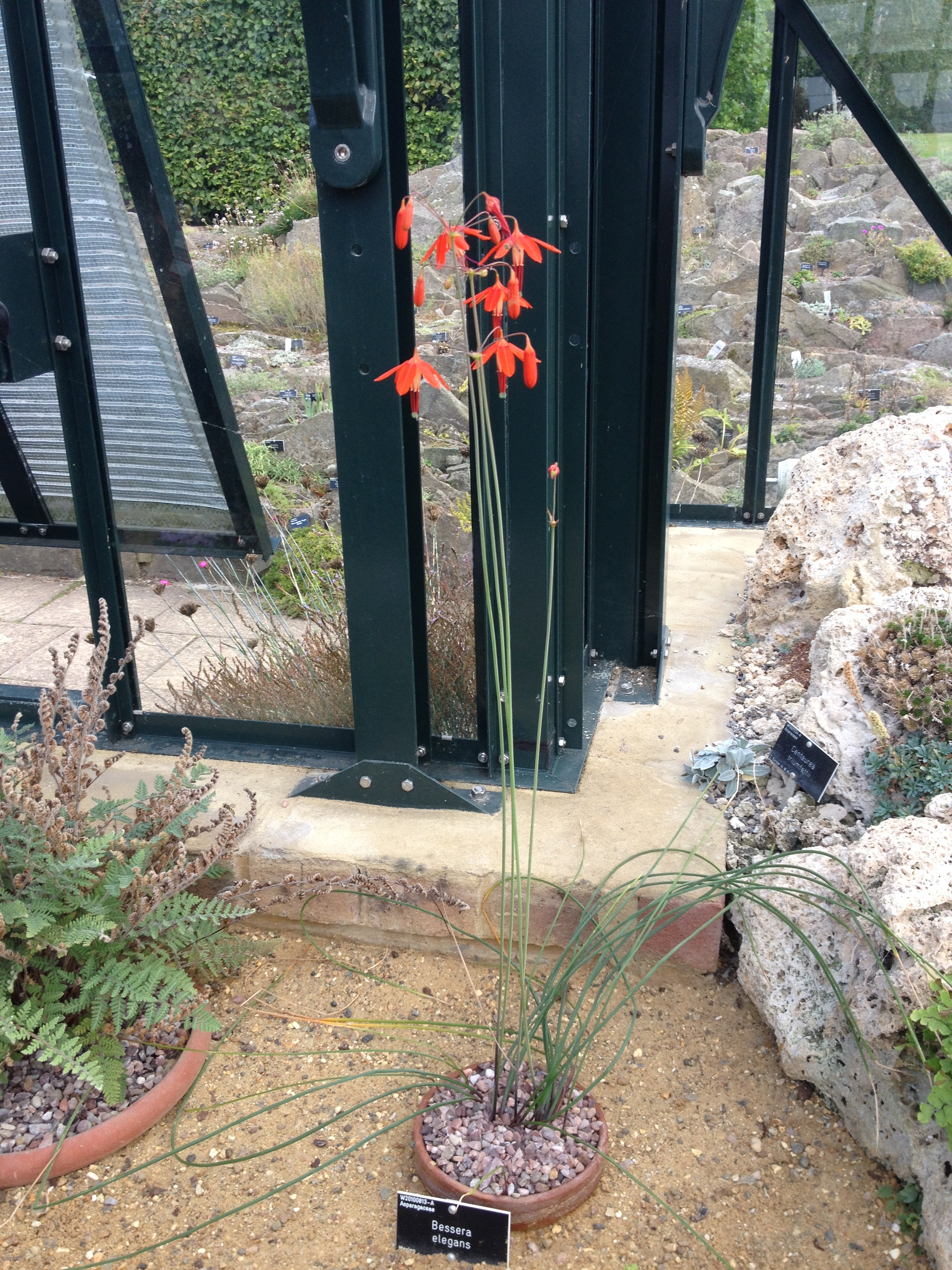
B. elegans growing in the alpine house at RHS Garden, Wisley in Surrey, England.

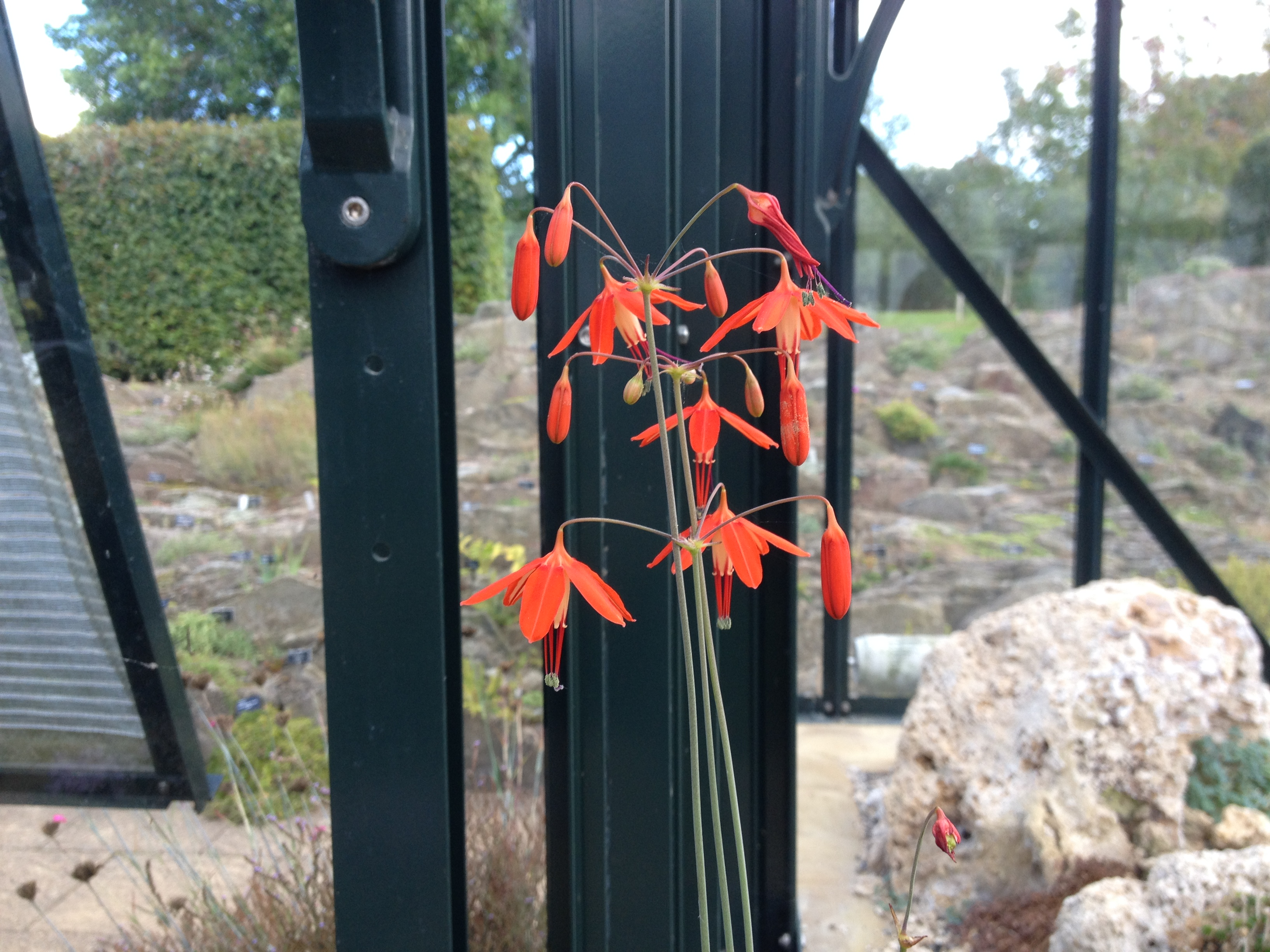
B. elegans inflorescence.

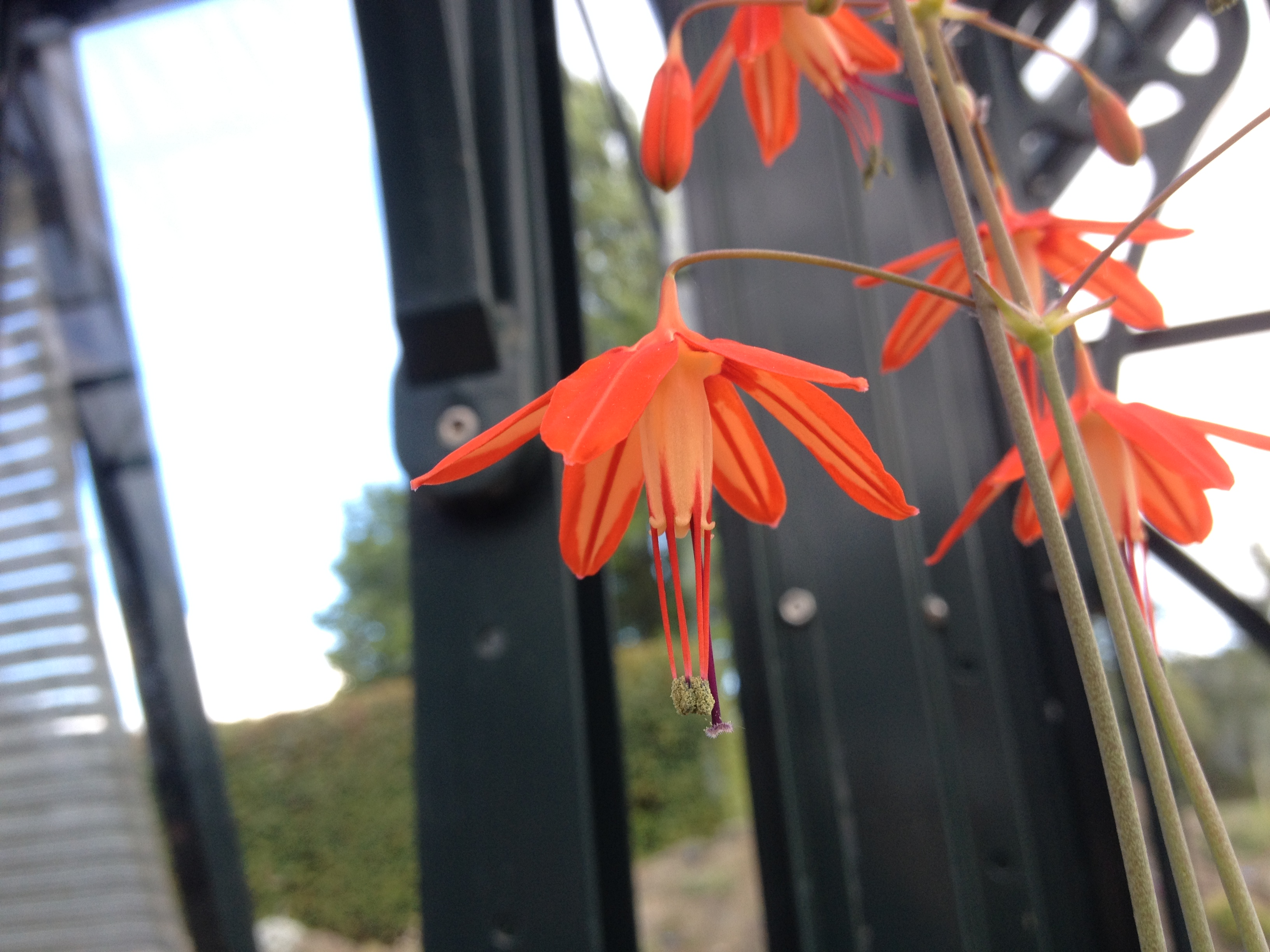
B. elegans flower detail.
