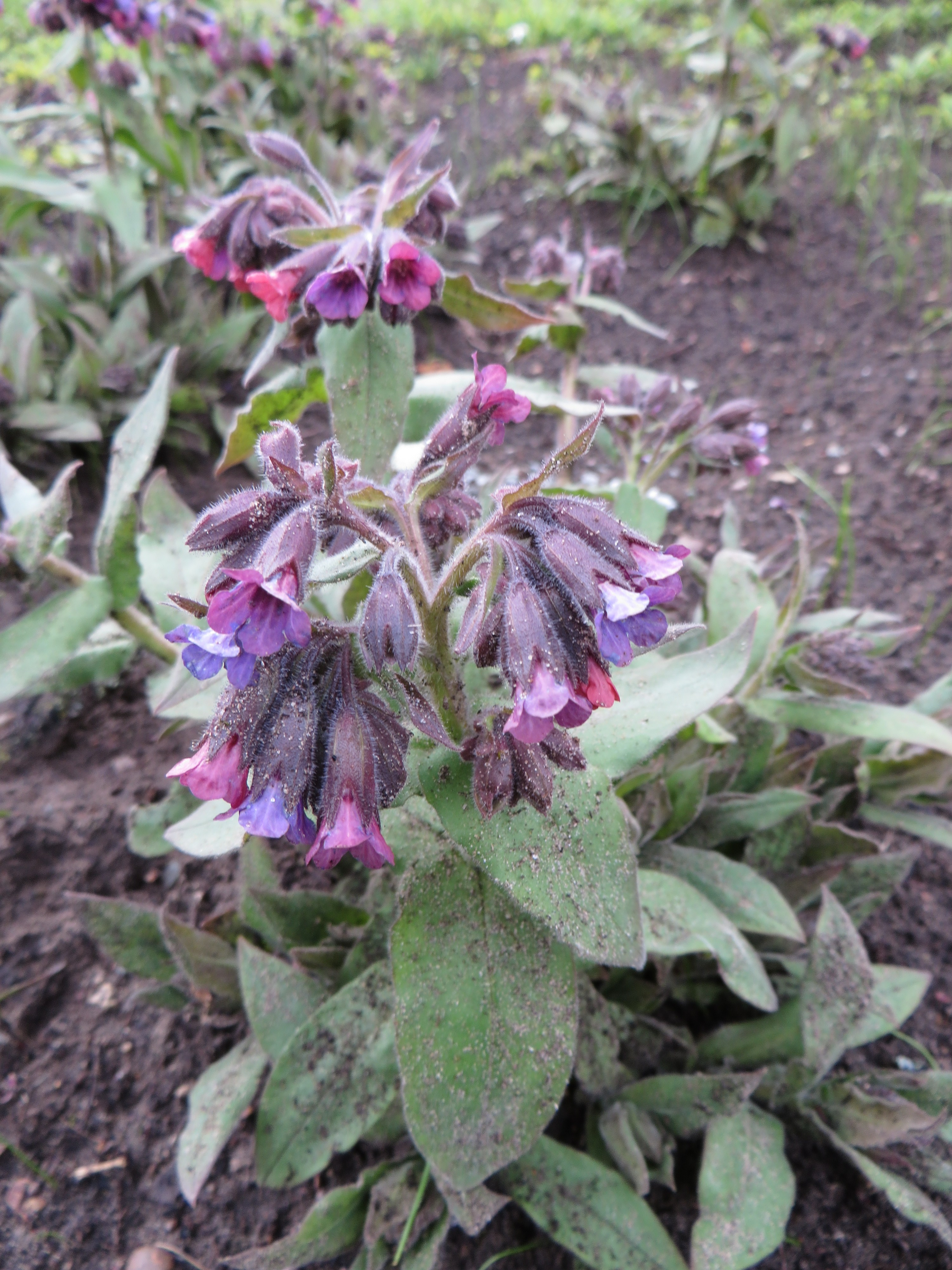

Scientific classification
- Kingdom: Plantae
- Clade: Tracheophytes
- Clade: Angiosperms
- Clade: Eudicots
- Clade: Asterids
- Order: Boraginales
- Family: Boraginaceae
- Genus: Pulmonaria
- Species: P. mollis

Binomial name
- Pulmonaria mollis Wulfen ex Hornem.

= Pulmonaria mollis =

Species of plant

Pulmonaria mollis is a perennial species of herb. It is very similar to P. angustifolia.

The species is native to various parts of Europe and Asia.

== Subspecies ==
The subspecies for this species include:

- Pulmonaria mollis subsp. alpigena W.Sauer – Austria, Germany, and Switzerland
- Pulmonaria mollis subsp. mollis – Central and eastern Europe to Turkey, the Caucasus, Kazakhstan, Siberia, Mongolia, and north-central China
- Pulmonaria mollis subsp. mollissima (A.Kern.) Nyman – East-central Europe, Greece, Turkey, and Transcaucasia

== Distribution and habitat ==
It is native to Germany, China, Turkey, Poland, Ukraine, Mongolia, Bulgaria, and Russia. In England it is cultivated for its basal leaves.

It often occurs in low abundance and can be found in deciduous forests, meadow slopes, as well stony places in the shade.
