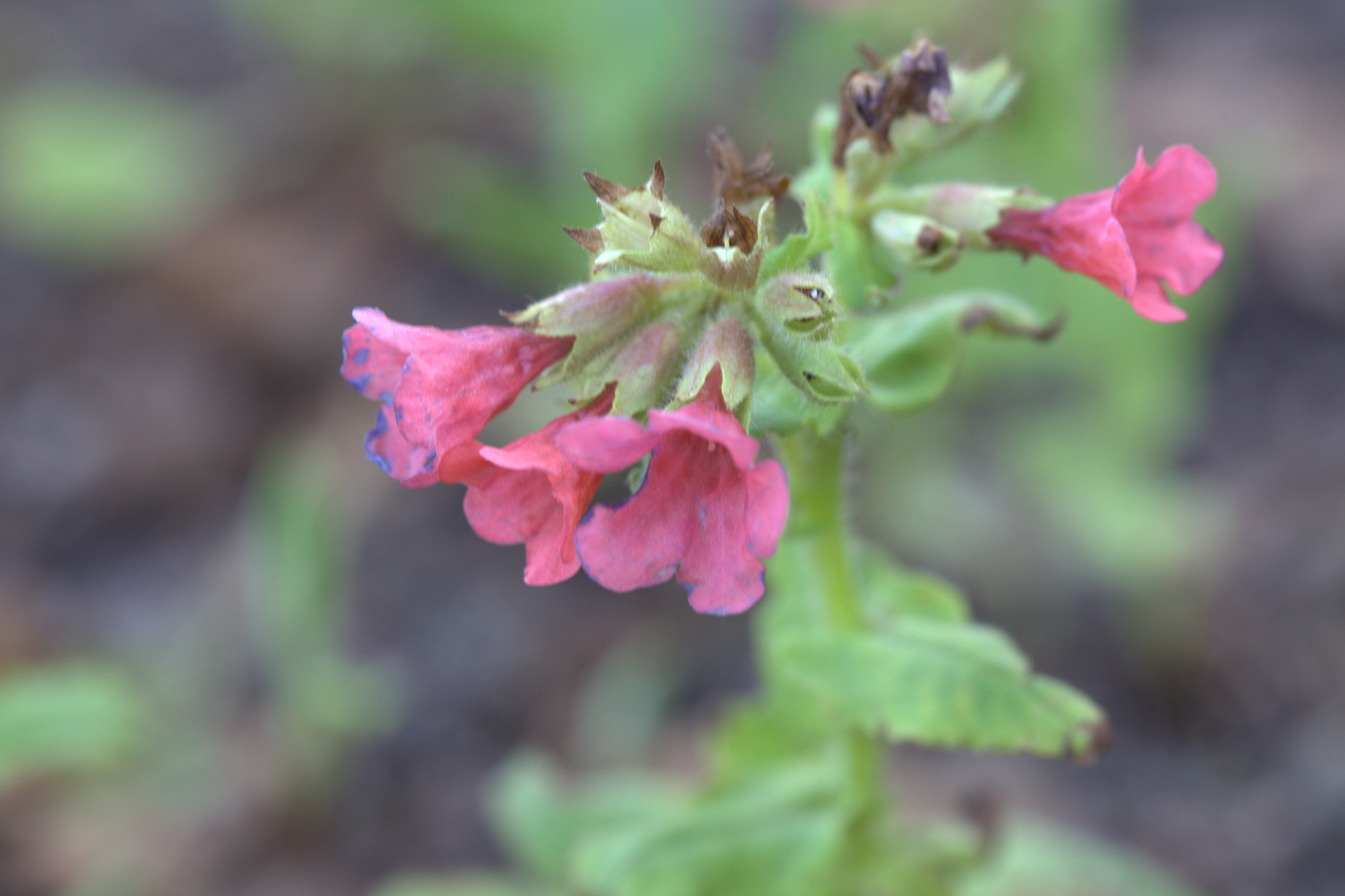
- At the Gothenburg Botanical Garden
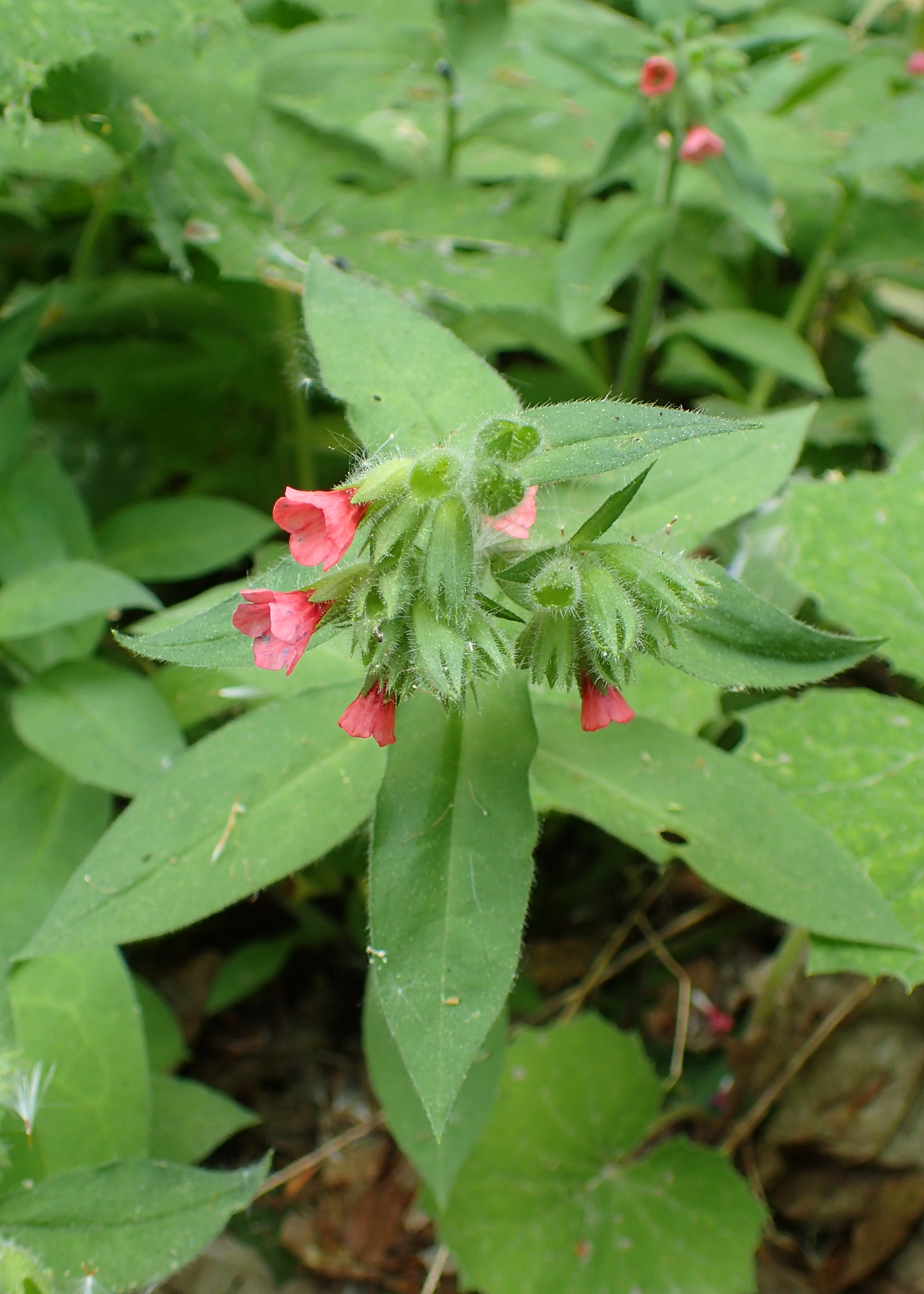
- Habit

Scientific classification
- Kingdom: Plantae
- Clade: Tracheophytes
- Clade: Angiosperms
- Clade: Eudicots
- Clade: Asterids
- Order: Boraginales
- Family: Boraginaceae
- Genus: Pulmonaria
- Species: P. rubra

Binomial name
- Pulmonaria rubra Schott

Synonyms
- Pulmonaria filarszkyana Jáv.; Pulmonaria obscura Rehmann; Pulmonaria transsilvanica Schur

= Pulmonaria rubra =

Species of plant

Pulmonaria rubra, the red lungwort, is a species of flowering plant in the family Boraginaceae. It is native to the Carpathian and Balkan Mountains, and it has been introduced to central Europe and Great Britain. A clump-forming perennial reaching 40 cm (16 in), it flowers from late winter to spring. Readily available from commercial suppliers, the Royal Horticultural Society considers it a good plant to attract pollinators. According to the Missouri Botanical Garden it is resistant to deer herbivory and to black walnut toxicity, is hardy in USDA zones 4 through 8, and is recommended for shady situations.

== Subtaxa ==
The following subspecies are accepted:

- Pulmonaria rubra subsp. filarszkyana (Jáv.) Domin – eastern Carpathians
- Pulmonaria rubra subsp. rubra – entire range

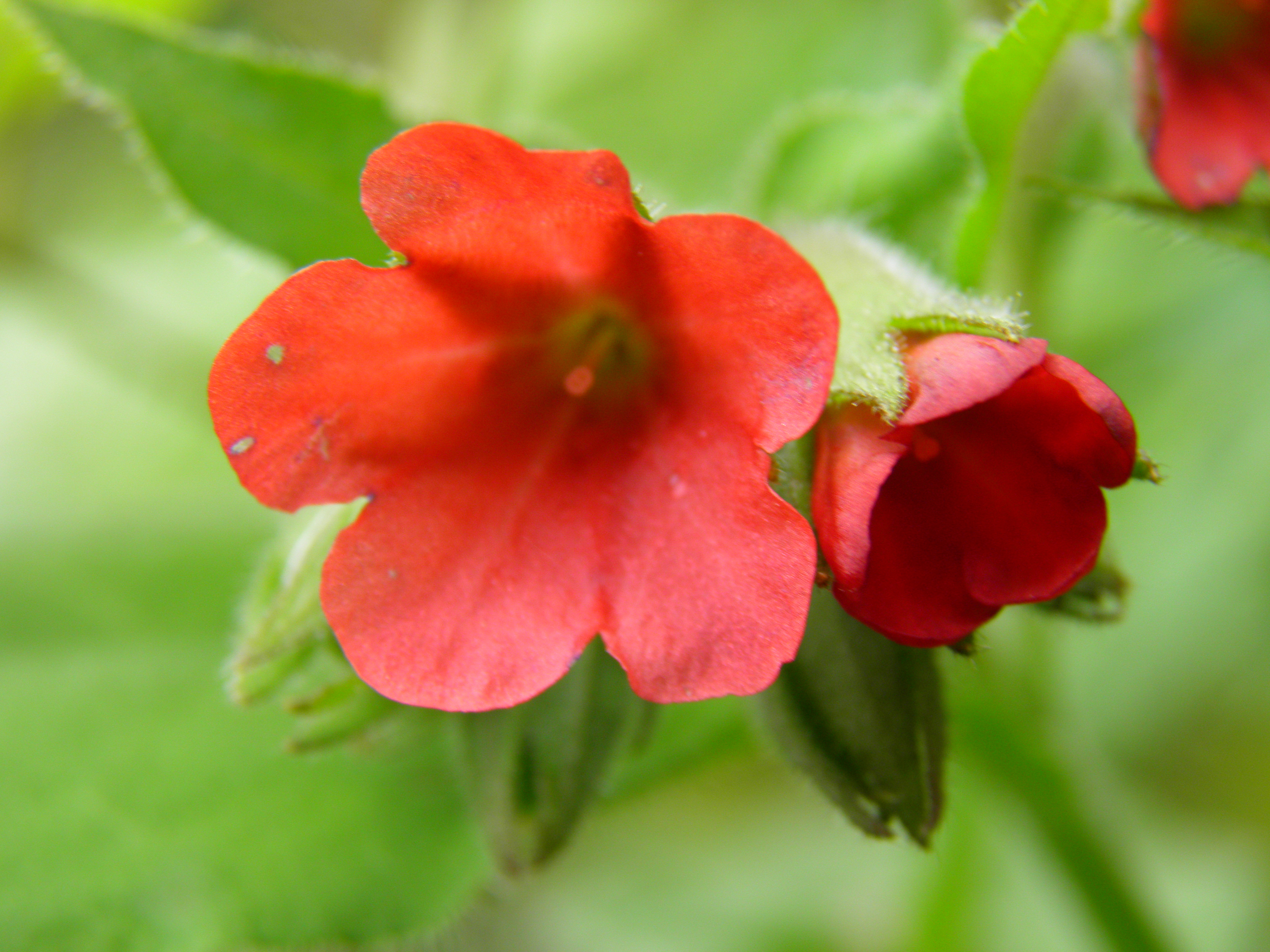
Pulmonaria rubra subsp. filarszkyana
