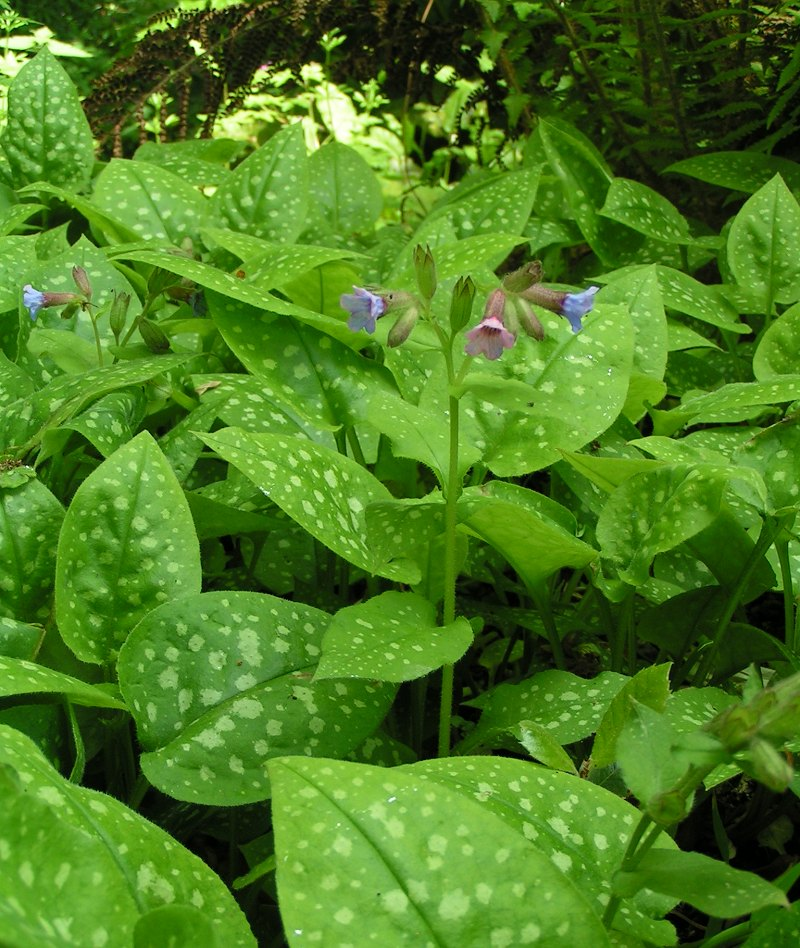
- Pulmonaria officinalis

Scientific classification
- Kingdom: Plantae
- Clade: Embryophytes
- Clade: Tracheophytes
- Clade: Spermatophytes
- Clade: Angiosperms
- Clade: Eudicots
- Clade: Asterids
- Order: Boraginales
- Family: Boraginaceae
- Subfamily: Boraginoideae
- Genus: Pulmonaria; L., 1753

Type species
- Pulmonaria officinalis L., 1753

Species
- 18; see text

Synonyms
- Bessera Schult. (1809), nom. illeg.; Paraskevia W.Sauer & G.Sauer (1980)

= Pulmonaria =

Genus of flowering plants in the borage family

Pulmonaria (lungwort) is a genus of flowering plants in the family Boraginaceae, native to Europe and western Asia, with one species (P. mollissima) east to central Asia. According to various estimates there may be between 10 and 18 species found in the wild.

== Description ==
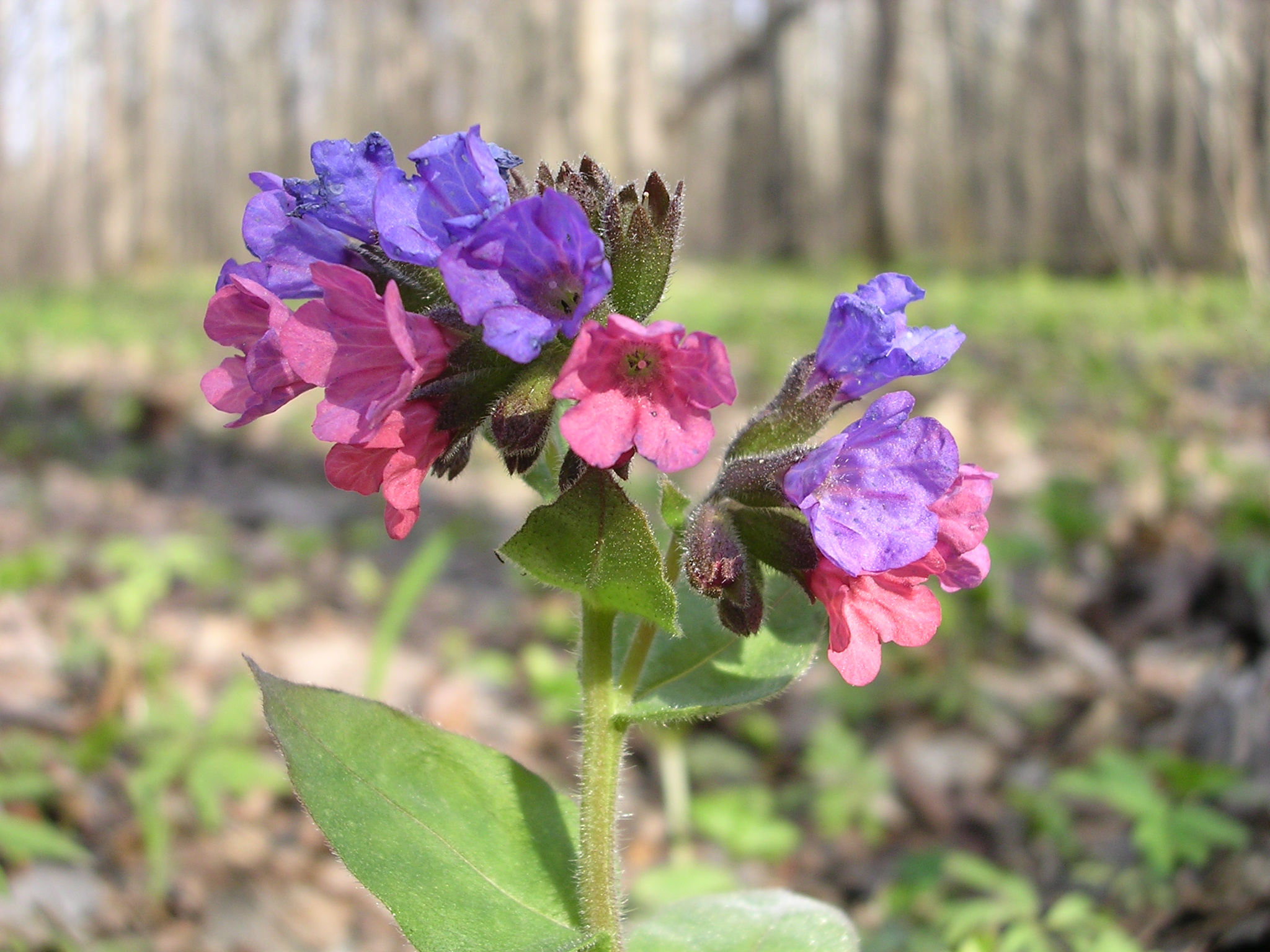
Arrangement of flowers

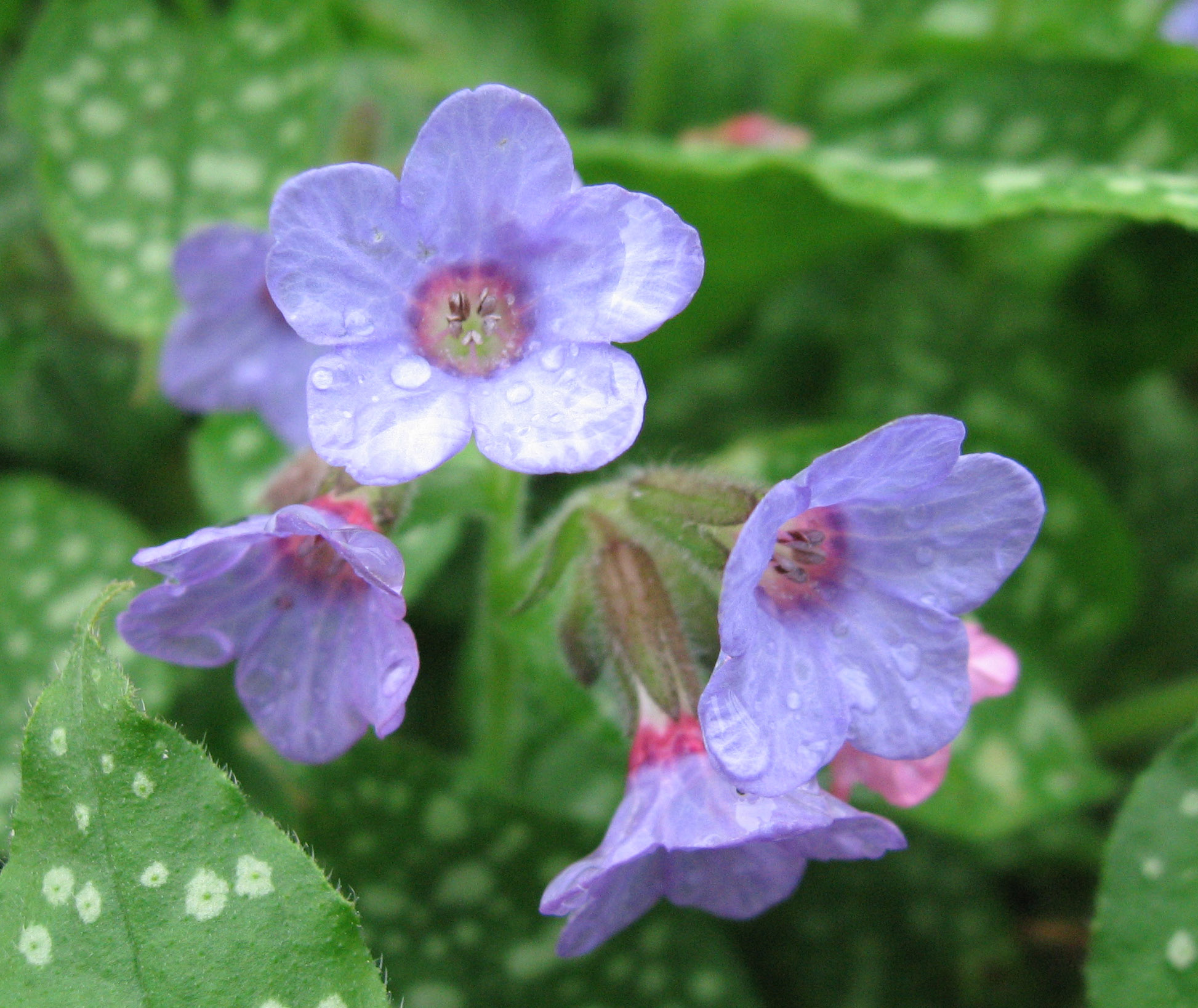
Detail of P. officinalis flowers

Lungworts are evergreen or herbaceous perennials that form clumps or rosettes. They are covered in hairs of varied length and stiffness, and sometimes also bear glands. The underground parts consist of a slowly creeping rhizome with adventitious roots. Flowering stems are unbranched, rough, covered with bristly hairs, usually not exceeding 30 cm (12 in), with a few exceptions (P. mollis, P. vallarsae). The stems are usually upright, or slightly spreading. The plants reach 15–25 cm (6–10 in) in height, spreading up to 60 cm (2.0 ft) wide.

The leaves are arranged in rosettes. The blades are usually large, from narrowly lanceolate to oval, with the base ranging from heart shaped to very gradually narrowing, and can have a sharply pointed or blunt tip. The leaf margin is always entire, but in some species and forms can be rather wavy. Basal leaves are carried on stalks that can be short or longer than the leaf blade in various species. Stem leaves are smaller and often narrower, and are unstalked or clasping the stem. All leaves are covered with hairs that are usually bristly, or occasionally soft. The leaves are often prominently spotted in black and blue, or sometimes in pale green, or unspotted. The spots are due to the presence of foliage air pockets. These pockets, which cool the lower leaf surface, mask the presence of chlorophyll.

The inflorescence is a terminal scorpioid cyme as a cymose corymb, with bracts, on short pedicels (stalks), reaching just above the foliage. The flowers are heterostylous, with two distinct forms of flower within each species; those with short stamens and long styles ("pin" flowers) and those with long stamens and short styles ("thrum" flowers), with the former usually being larger and more showy. The calyx is hairy, 5-lobed, tubular or funnel-shaped, enlarging as the fruit ripens. The corolla is funnel-shaped and consists of a long, cylindrical tube and a limb with five shallow lobes. Within the corolla throat, five tufts of hairs alternate with the stamens to form a ring. The colour of the corolla varies from purple, violet or blue to shades of pink and red, or sometimes white. The colour of the flower in bud is often pink to violet when they first emerge, which then changes to blue as the flower matures. The stamens and style are included within the corolla and not protruding.

The nutlets are smooth, egg-shaped, brownish, up to 4.5 mm (0.2 in) long and 3 mm (0.1 in) wide, each containing a single seed. Up to four nutlets per flower are produced, ripening mostly in summer.

== Taxonomy ==
Pulmonaria is a genus in the Boraginoideae subfamily of Boraginaceae, consisting of approximately 18 species, although species delineation (speciation) has proved problematic. Within the Boraginoideae, Pulmonaria is placed in the tribe Boragineae, where it is closely related to Borago.

=== Species ===
18 species are accepted.

- Pulmonaria affinis Jord.
- Pulmonaria angustifolia L.
- Pulmonaria australis (Murr) W.Sauer
- Pulmonaria carnica W.Sauer
- Pulmonaria cesatiana (Fenzl & Friedr.) Selvi, Bigazzi, Hilger & Papini
- Pulmonaria collina W.Sauer
- Pulmonaria × digenea A.Kern.
- Pulmonaria × heinrichii Sabr.
- Pulmonaria helvetica Bolliger
- Pulmonaria hirta L.
- Pulmonaria × hybrida A.Kern.
- Pulmonaria × intermedia Palla
- Pulmonaria kerneri Wettst.
- Pulmonaria × landoziana Péterfi
- Pulmonaria longifolia (Bastard) Boreau
- Pulmonaria mollis J.F.Wolff ex Hornem.
- Pulmonaria montana Lej.
- Pulmonaria × norica Teyber
- Pulmonaria × notha A.Kern.
- Pulmonaria obscura Dumort.
- Pulmonaria officinalis L.
- Pulmonaria × ovalis Bastard
- Pulmonaria rubra Schott
- Pulmonaria saccharata Mill.
- Pulmonaria stiriaca A.Kern.
- Pulmonaria visianii Degen & Lengyel

=== Etymology ===
The scientific name Pulmonaria is derived from Latin pulmo (lung). In the times of sympathetic magic, the spotted oval leaves of P. officinalis were thought to symbolize diseased, ulcerated lungs, and so were used to treat pulmonary infections. The common name in many languages also refers to lungs, as in English "lungwort", German Lungenkraut, French herbe aux poumons, and Serbian plućnjak. In some East European languages, the common name is derived from a word for honey, e.g. Russian medunitza, Polish miodunka, Serbian meduniče, Bulgarian медуница.

== Distribution and habitat ==
The species of the genus are distributed across Eurasia.

== Ecology ==
Pulmonaria is an early spring flowering deciduous perennial, retaining its leaves till late winter, just before the new growth emerges.

=== Pests and diseases ===
Pulmonaria species are used as food plants by the larvae of some Lepidoptera species. These include the case-bearer Coleophora pulmonariella, which feeds exclusively on P. saccharata, and the moth Ethmia pusiella, which has been recorded on P. officinalis.

== Cultivation ==
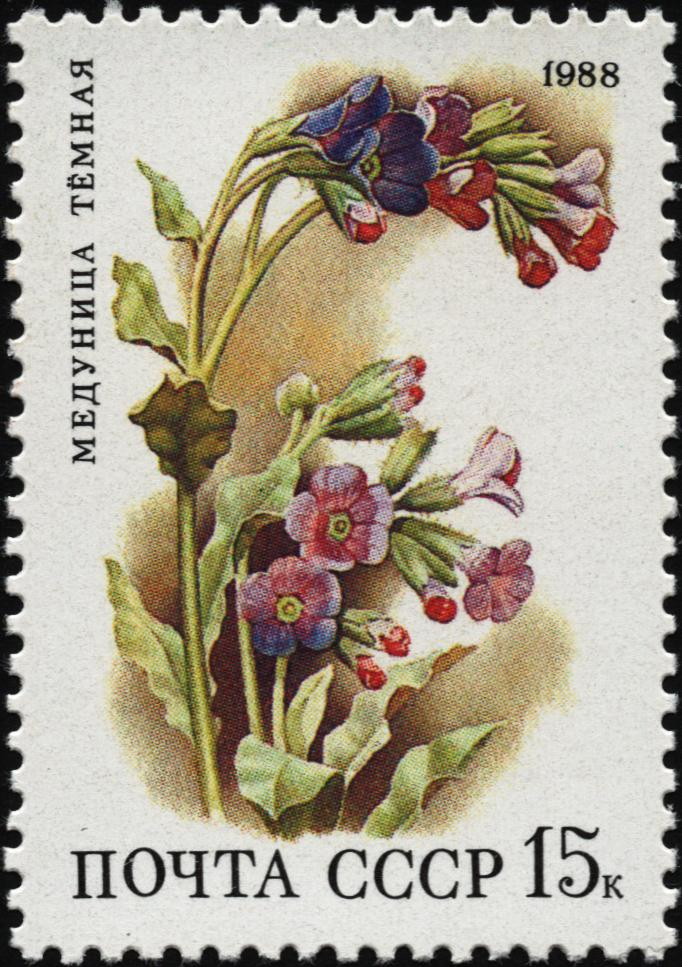
Pulmonaria on stamp of USSR

Of the known species of Pulmonaria, only about eight are known in cultivation. Pulmonaria are used as ornamental garden plants, particularly P. saccharata, P. angustifolia and P. longifolia. Others include P. affinis.They are especially valued as groundcover in damp shaded areas, producing their blue and/or pink flowers in late winter and early spring, accompanied by dense clusters of heart-shaped leaves that are often strikingly mottled and marbled, throughout summer.

The following cultivars, of mixed or uncertain parentage, have gained the Royal Horticultural Society's Award of Garden Merit:

- 'Blue Ensign'
- 'Cotton Cool'
- 'Diana Clare'
- 'Lewis Palmer'
- 'Little Star'
- Opal = 'Ocupol'
- 'Sissinghurst White'
- 'Trevi Fountain'
- 'Vera May'

== Bibliography ==
- Avent, Tony (March 2012). "Pulmonaria - The World of Lungworts". Plant Delights.
- Chacón, Juliana; Luebert, Federico; Hilger, Hartmut H.; Ovchinnikova, Svetlana; Selvi, Federico; Cecchi, Lorenzo; Guilliams, C. Matt; Hasenstab-Lehman, Kristen; Sutorý, Karel; Simpson, Michael G.; Weigend, Maximilian (24 June 2016). "The borage family (Boraginaceae s.str.): A revised infrafamilial classification based on new phylogenetic evidence, with emphasis on the placement of some enigmatic genera" (PDF). Taxon. 65 (3): 523–546. Bibcode:2016Taxon..65..523C. doi:10.12705/653.6. hdl:2158/1062785.
- Meeus, Sofie; Janssens, Steven; Helsen, Kenny; Jacquemyn, Hans (May 2016). "Evolutionary trends in the distylous genus Pulmonaria (Boraginaceae): Evidence of ancient hybridization and current interspecific gene flow". Molecular Phylogenetics and Evolution. 98: 63–73. Bibcode:2016MolPE..98...63M. doi:10.1016/j.ympev.2015.11.022. PMID 26732490.
- Flora Europaea: Pulmonaria
- Flora of China: Pulmonaria
- Bennett, M. (2003) Pulmonarias and the Borage Family. B.T.Batsford, 240pp. ISBN 0-7134-8732-1
- Hewitt, J. (1994). Pulmonarias. Hardy Plant Society, 51pp. ISBN 0-901687-10-3
