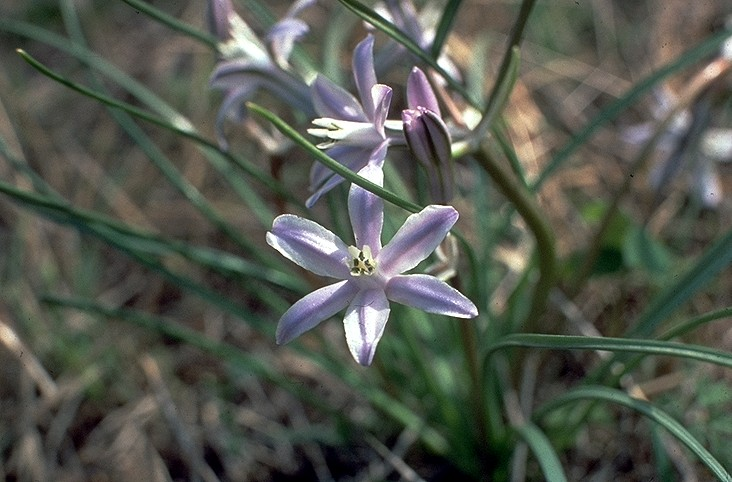
- blue funnel lily Androstephium coeruleum

Scientific classification
- Kingdom: Plantae
- Clade: Embryophytes
- Clade: Tracheophytes
- Clade: Spermatophytes
- Clade: Angiosperms
- Clade: Monocots
- Order: Asparagales
- Family: Asparagaceae
- Subfamily: Brodiaeoideae
- Genus: Androstephium; Torr.

Type species
- Androstephium violaceum (syn of A. coeruleum) Torr.

= Androstephium =

Genus of flowering plants

The genus Androstephium is a group of North American plants in the cluster lily subfamily within the asparagus family. It contains two species native to the southwestern and south-central United States.

Species

Image	Scientific name	Common name	Distribution
	Androstephium breviflorum S.Watson	pink funnel lily	deserts of Arizona, Utah, southeastern California, southern Nevada, northwestern New Mexico, western Colorado, southern Wyoming
	Androstephium coeruleum (Scheele) Greene	blue funnel lily	grasslands of Texas, Oklahoma, Kansas
