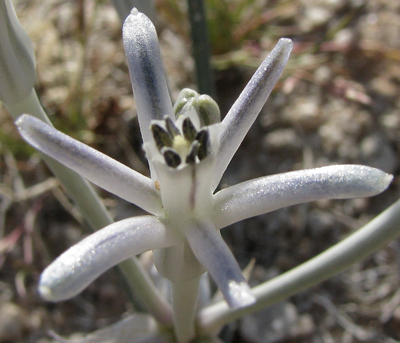

Conservation status
- Secure (NatureServe)

Scientific classification
- Kingdom: Plantae
- Clade: Tracheophytes
- Clade: Angiosperms
- Clade: Monocots
- Order: Asparagales
- Family: Asparagaceae
- Subfamily: Brodiaeoideae
- Genus: Androstephium
- Species: A. breviflorum

Binomial name
- Androstephium breviflorum S.Watson

= Androstephium breviflorum =

Species of flowering plant

Androstephium breviflorum is a species of flowering plant known by the common names pink funnel lily and small flowered androstephium.

== Distribution ==
This monocot plant is native to the deserts of the Western United States from Wyoming and New Mexico west through the Great Basin and Sonoran Desert, to creosote bush scrub in the Mojave Desert of eastern California.

It grows at elevations of 100–1,600 metres (330–5,250 ft) in sandy to rocky soil of open desert scrub.

== Description ==
Androstephium breviflorum is a perennial herb growing from a spherical corm.

Its inflorescence is a peduncle up to 30 centimeters tall containing up to 12 white to light lavender funnel-shaped flowers each one or two centimeters long. The bloom period is March to June.

The fruit is a 3-lobed capsule just over a centimeter long.

== History ==
Androstephium breviflorum was published as a new species by Sereno Watson in 1873, based on material collected by Ellen Powell Thompson in 1872 in the vicinity of Kanab, Utah, during the US Topographical and Geological Survey of the Colorado River (led by John Wesley Powell). Her specimen, the holotype, resides in the United States National Herbarium (US).
