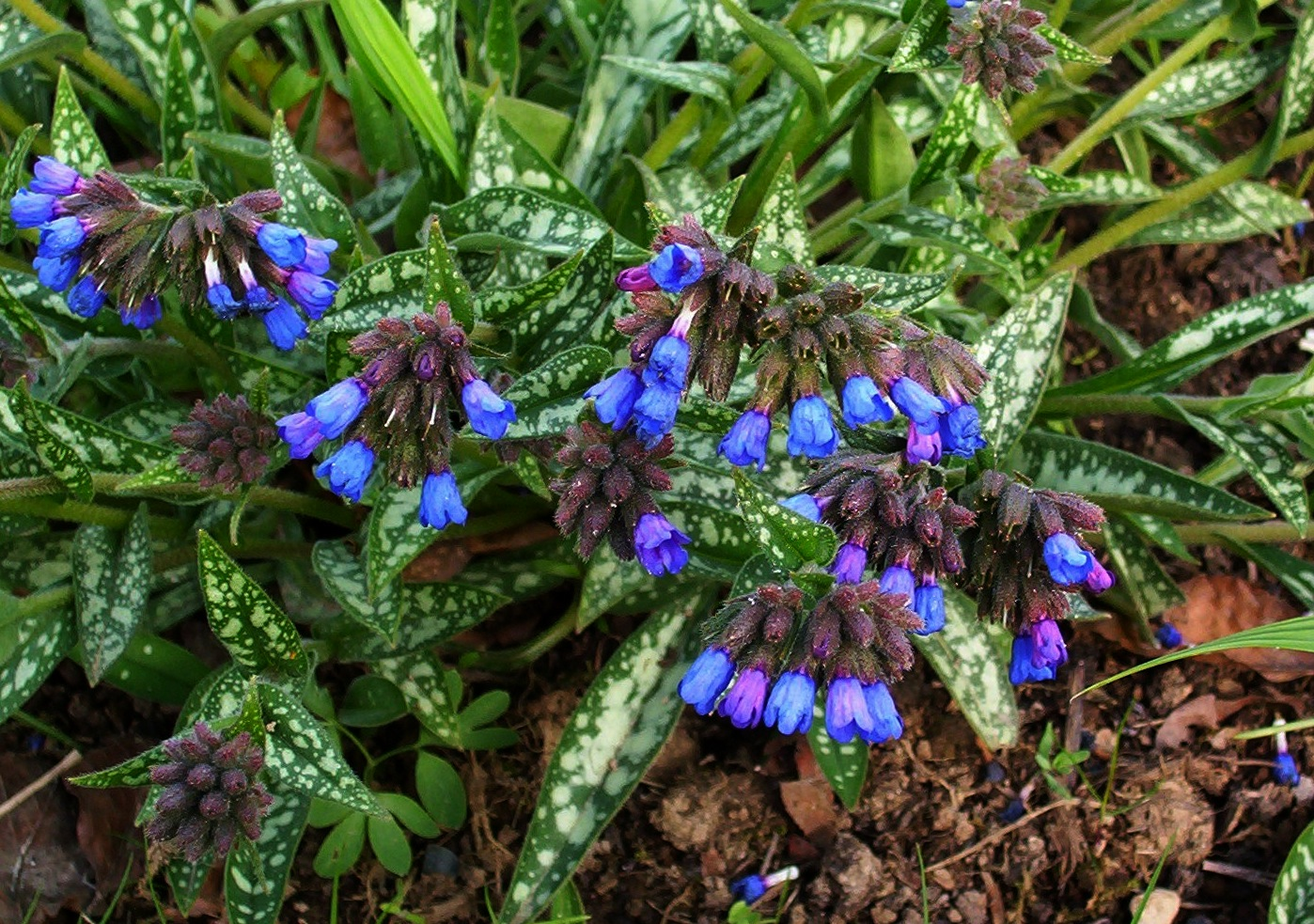

Scientific classification
- Kingdom: Plantae
- Clade: Tracheophytes
- Clade: Angiosperms
- Clade: Eudicots
- Clade: Asterids
- Order: Boraginales
- Family: Boraginaceae
- Genus: Pulmonaria
- Species: P. longifolia

Binomial name
- Pulmonaria longifolia (Bastard) Boreau

= Pulmonaria longifolia =

Species of flowering plant

Pulmonaria longifolia, the narrow-leaved lungwort, is a semi-evergreen clump-forming herbaceous perennial plant, native to western Europe, including Britain, France, Spain, Portugal. It grows in semi-shaded habitats, such as woodland and scrub, to 2000 m above sea level.

The stems are upright, 20–40 cm (rarely to 60 cm), not scaly at base, covered with bristly and some glandular hairs. The basal leaves are up to 40–60 centimetres (16–24 in) long and 6 centimetres (2.4 in) wide, narrowly lanceolate, gradually narrowed into a stalk, upper surface usually spotted white or pale green. The stem leaves are lanceolate or oval-lanceolate, stalkless, half-clasping the stem.

The flowers are funnel-shaped, carried in short hairy cymes in spring. The corolla is 8–12 mm long, pink turning blue or violet. The fruit is a nutlet to 4 millimetres (0.16 in) long and 3 millimetres (0.12 in) broad. Chromosomes 2n=14.

Three subspecies have been described, but are not accepted as distinct by the Flora Europaea.

In the New Forest in England, P. longifolia shares its habitat with wild daffodil (Narcissus pseudonarcissus), bluebell (Hyacinthoides non-scripta), wood-sorrel (Oxalis acetosella), bastard balm (Melittis melissophyllum), wood anemone (Anemone nemorosa), columbine (Aquilegia vulgaris).

== Cultivation ==
In the garden, P. longifolia is hardy to hardiness zone 5. It prefers light shade but tolerates sun better than most pulmonarias, and will not do well in heavy shade. Can be grown on very heavy clay soil.

The following cultivars are available:

- 'Ankum' (syn. 'Coen Jansen') – a compact mound-forming plant with small, bright violet-blue flowers, and narrow, very silvery leaves with wavy margins.
- 'Bertram Anderson' – with smallish vivid blue flowers, and long, narrow, silver-spotted leaves.
- 'Dordogne' – with blue flowers carried on upright stems, large lanceolate leaves, spotted silver-white.

Other Pulmonaria cultivars related to this species include 'Merlin', 'Roy Davidson', 'Weetwood Blue'.
