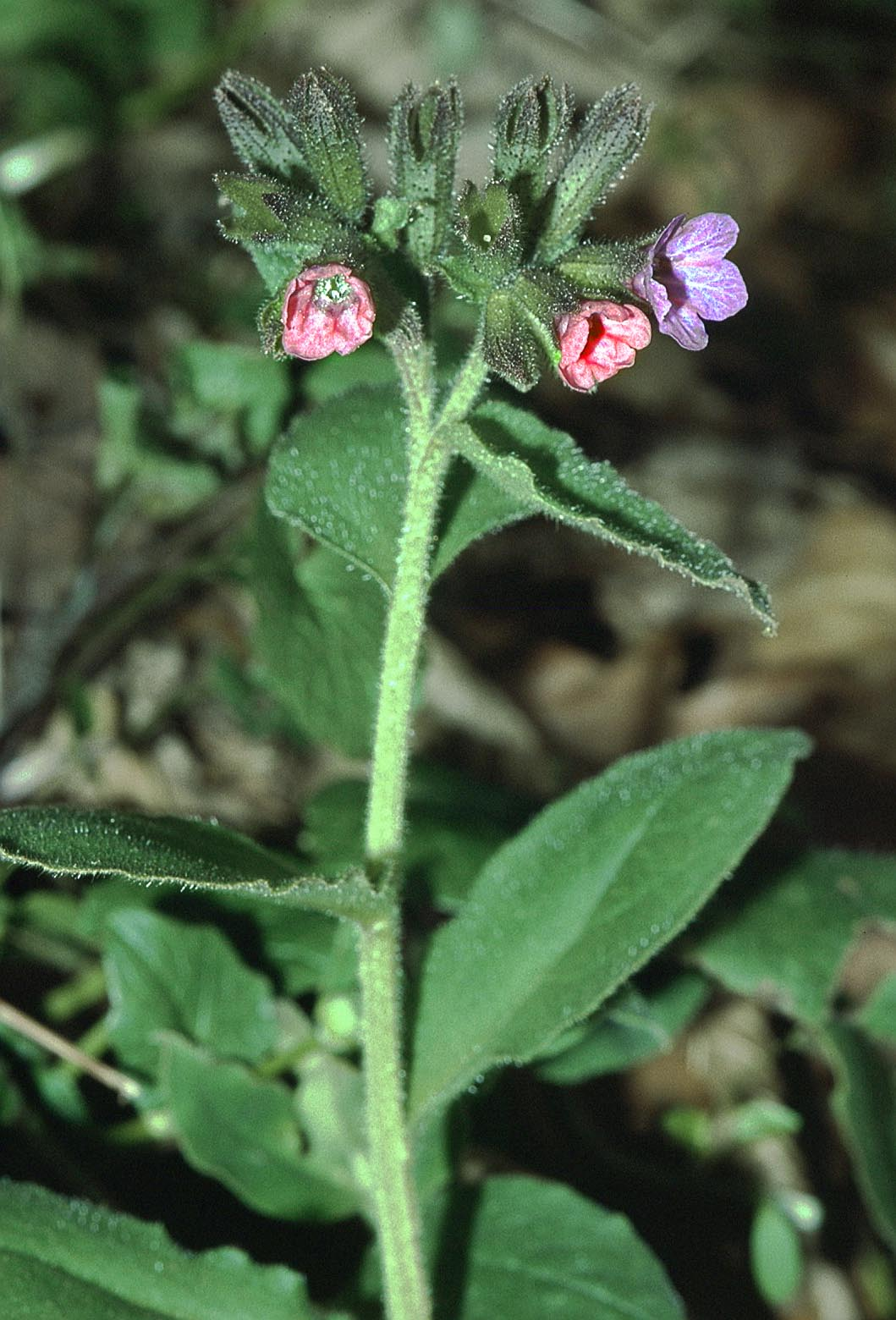

Scientific classification
- Kingdom: Plantae
- Clade: Tracheophytes
- Clade: Angiosperms
- Clade: Eudicots
- Clade: Asterids
- Order: Boraginales
- Family: Boraginaceae
- Genus: Pulmonaria
- Species: P. obscura

Binomial name
- Pulmonaria obscura Dumort.

Synonyms
- Pulmonaria officinalis subsp. obscura (Dumort) Murbeck.

= Pulmonaria obscura =

Species of flowering plant

Pulmonaria obscura, common names unspotted lungwort or Suffolk lungwort, is a herbaceous evergreen perennial rhizomatous plant of the genus Pulmonaria, belonging to the family Boraginaceae. In Central Europe it is the most widely occurring member of the Boraginaceae.

== Description ==
The perennial herb reaches a height of about 10 to 20, sometimes up to 30 cm. The stem grows upright and is covered in the upper part with strong bristles, stem glands and soft hairs. The leaves have softer hairs. They are 4–6 cm long, 1–2 cm wide, and very rarely with pale green patches along the veins. The basal leaves are heart-shaped and oblong, have an approximately 5 to 10 cm long stem, and a length of 4 to 12 cm and are about twice as long as wide. The flowers are about 10 to 15 mm long, initially pink and later red-violet. The corolla tube is bald under the hair ring. The seeds have a length of 3.5 to 4 mm and are brown to black.

== Habitat ==
It grows in deciduous and coniferous mixed forests. It usually prefers poorly drained, nutrient-rich, and mostly calcareous soils.

== Distribution ==
Its distribution ranges from central Sweden and southern Finland to Central Europe. In Austria, the species is very rare and endangered, while it is common in Northern Switzerland. In Britain it is quite rare, but its presence has been confirmed for Suffolk.
