= Ethmia fumidella =

Scientific classification
- Kingdom: Animalia
- Phylum: Arthropoda
- Clade: Pancrustacea
- Class: Insecta
- Order: Lepidoptera
- Family: Depressariidae
- Genus: Ethmia
- Species: E. fumidella

Binomial name
- Ethmia fumidella (Wocke, 1850)

Synonyms
- Psecadia fumidella Wocke, 1850; Psecadia pusiella var. ardosiella Caradja, 1931

Species of moth

Ethmia fumidella is a moth in the family Depressariidae. It can be found in Spain, Portugal, Austria, Hungary, Romania, Greece, Turkey and on Crete.

== Subspecies ==
- Ethmia fumidella fumidella (Austria, Hungary, Romania, Greece, Turkey, Crete)
- Ethmia fumidella turcica de Lattin, 1963 (Asia Minor)
- Ethmia fumidella delattini Agenjo, 1964 (Spain, Portugal)
