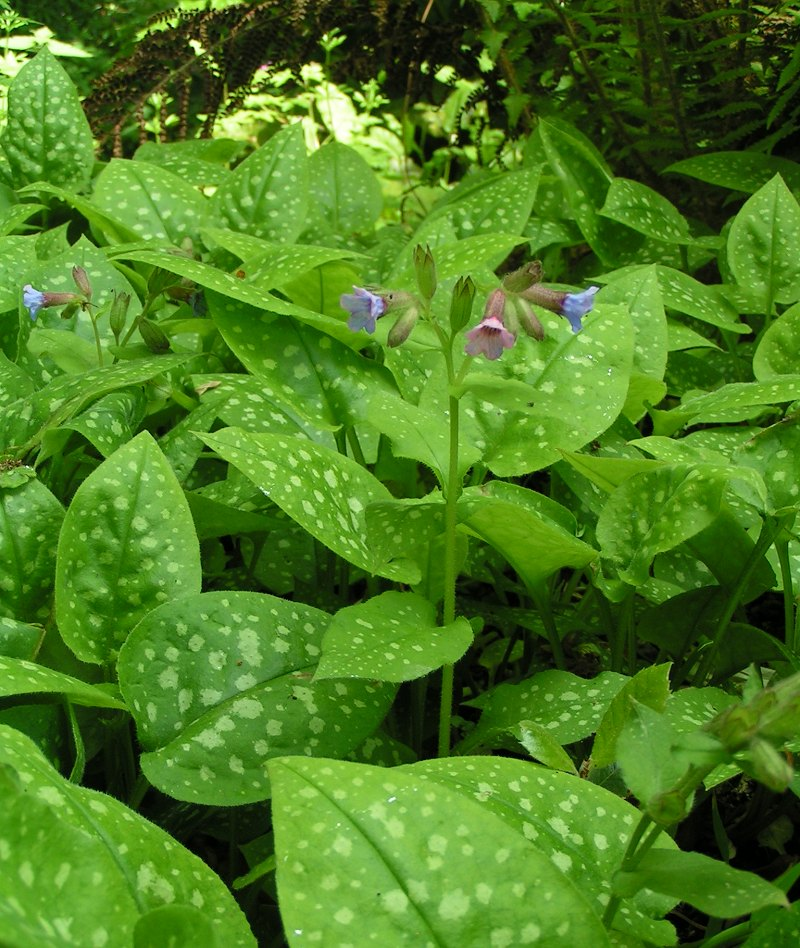

Conservation status
- Least Concern (IUCN 3.1)

Scientific classification
- Kingdom: Plantae
- Clade: Tracheophytes
- Clade: Angiosperms
- Clade: Eudicots
- Clade: Asterids
- Order: Boraginales
- Family: Boraginaceae
- Genus: Pulmonaria
- Species: P. officinalis

Binomial name
- Pulmonaria officinalis L.

Synonyms
- Pulmonaria maculosa Liebl.; Pulmonaria officinalis subsp. maculosa (Hay) Gams.

= Pulmonaria officinalis =

Species of flowering plant

Pulmonaria officinalis, common names lungwort, common lungwort, Mary's tears or Our Lady's milk drops, is a herbaceous rhizomatous evergreen perennial plant of the genus Pulmonaria, belonging to the family Boraginaceae.

== Etymology ==
The genus name comes from the Latin pulmo meaning lung and was first used by Leonhart Fuchs (1501–1566), a German physician and one of the three founding fathers of botany. The species was named officinalis by Carl Linnaeus for the medical properties of these plants, used since the Middle Ages to treat coughs and diseases of the chest, because of the doctrine of signatures whereby Christian doctors believed that plants that resemble any body part could be used to treat illnesses in this part since God put his signature in the plant to guide mankind.

== Description ==
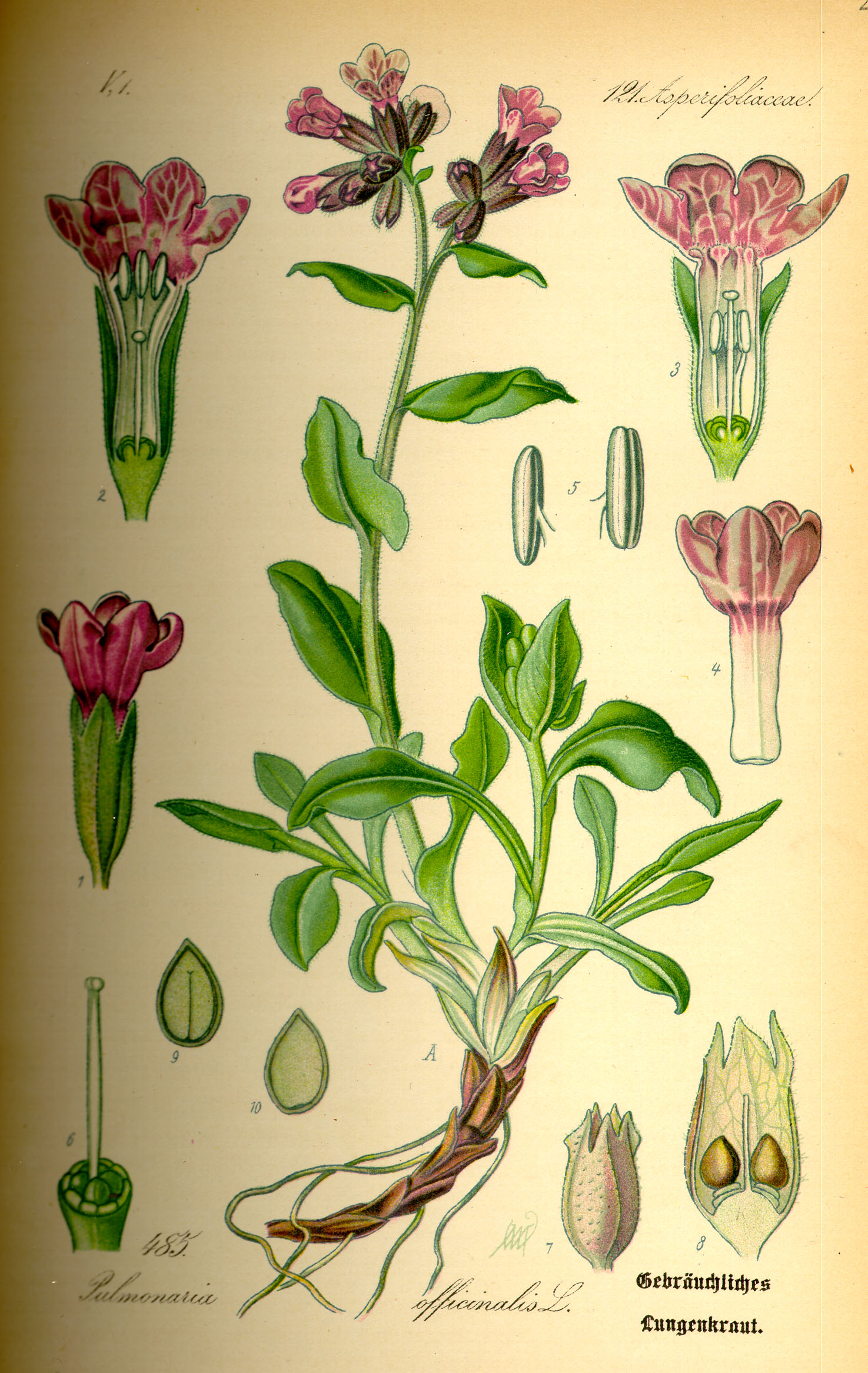
Botanical sketch of Pulmonaria officinalis showing seeds, from Flora von Deutschland, Österreich und der Schweiz 1885 Thomé

The basal leaves are green, cordate, more or less elongated and pointed and always with rounded and often sharply defined white or pale green patches. The upper surface of the leaves has tiny bumps and it is quite hairy. The leaves of this host plant are eaten by the caterpillars of the moth Ethmia pusiella. In spring, the plant produces small bunches of flowers. The 5-petal flowers are red or pink at first, later turn to blue-purple during the anthesis, by changing the pH value inside of the petals. As a matter of fact the flowers contain a dye that belongs to the anthocyanins and change the color from red (acidic) to blue (alkaline). Pulmonaria officinalis is diploid and has the chromosome number 2n = 14. Flowering period extends from March through May and the seeds ripen from May to June. Pollination is granted by insects (entomophily) - mainly bees, bumblebees and butterflies - the spread of seeds over ants.

== Distribution ==
This native species is perhaps the most widespread plant in Europe. It is distributed west in the Ardennes up to the Netherlands, Denmark and southern Sweden. It is missing in Norway and it is only naturalized in the British Isles. It reaches central Russia and the Caucasus and it occurs in the Balkans and in northern to central Italy.

== Habitat ==
Pulmonaria officinalis is an understory species. It grows in deciduous and beech mixed forests from the lowlands to the mountains. It prefers fresh and shady areas, nutrient-rich and mostly calcareous, stony or pure clay loam soils, at an altitude of 0–1,500 meters (0–4,921 ft) above sea level. As a spring geophyte it starts its vegetative period before full foliation of the tree storey. During this time, it is exposed to high solar radiation, which presents a potential danger for the plant. After leaf out, the amount of solar radiation decreases. The plant is adapted to changing conditions with efficient protective and repair mechanisms (morphological characteristics of leaves, epidermal structure, UV-B absorbing substances). After foliation, the amount of photosynthetic pigments in plant leaves slightly increases due to less sunlight available. On the contrary, the UV-B absorbing substances (flavonoids and anthocyanins) are significantly reduced after foliation.

== Gallery ==
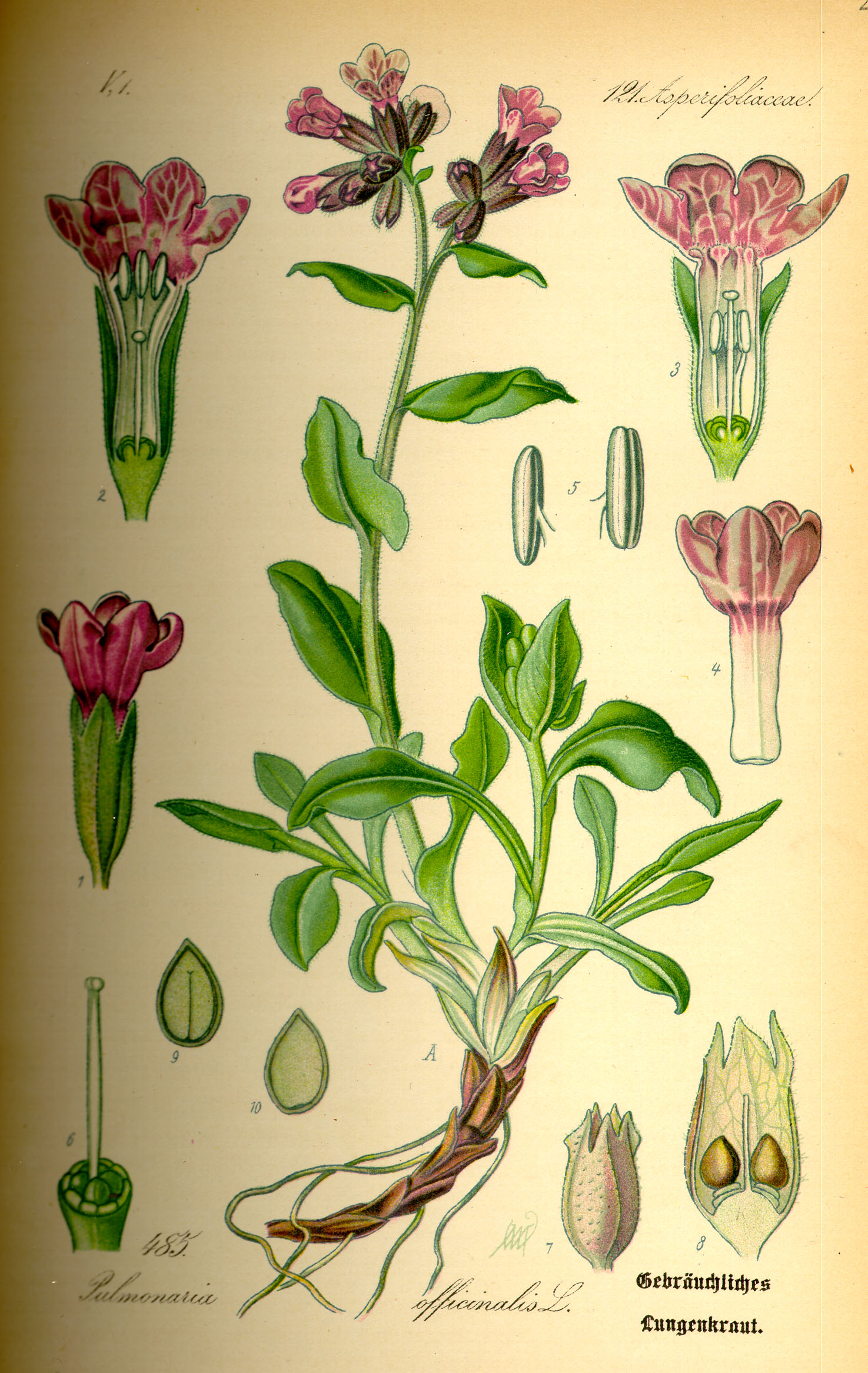
Illustration of Pulmonaria officinalis from Flora von Deutschland, 1885

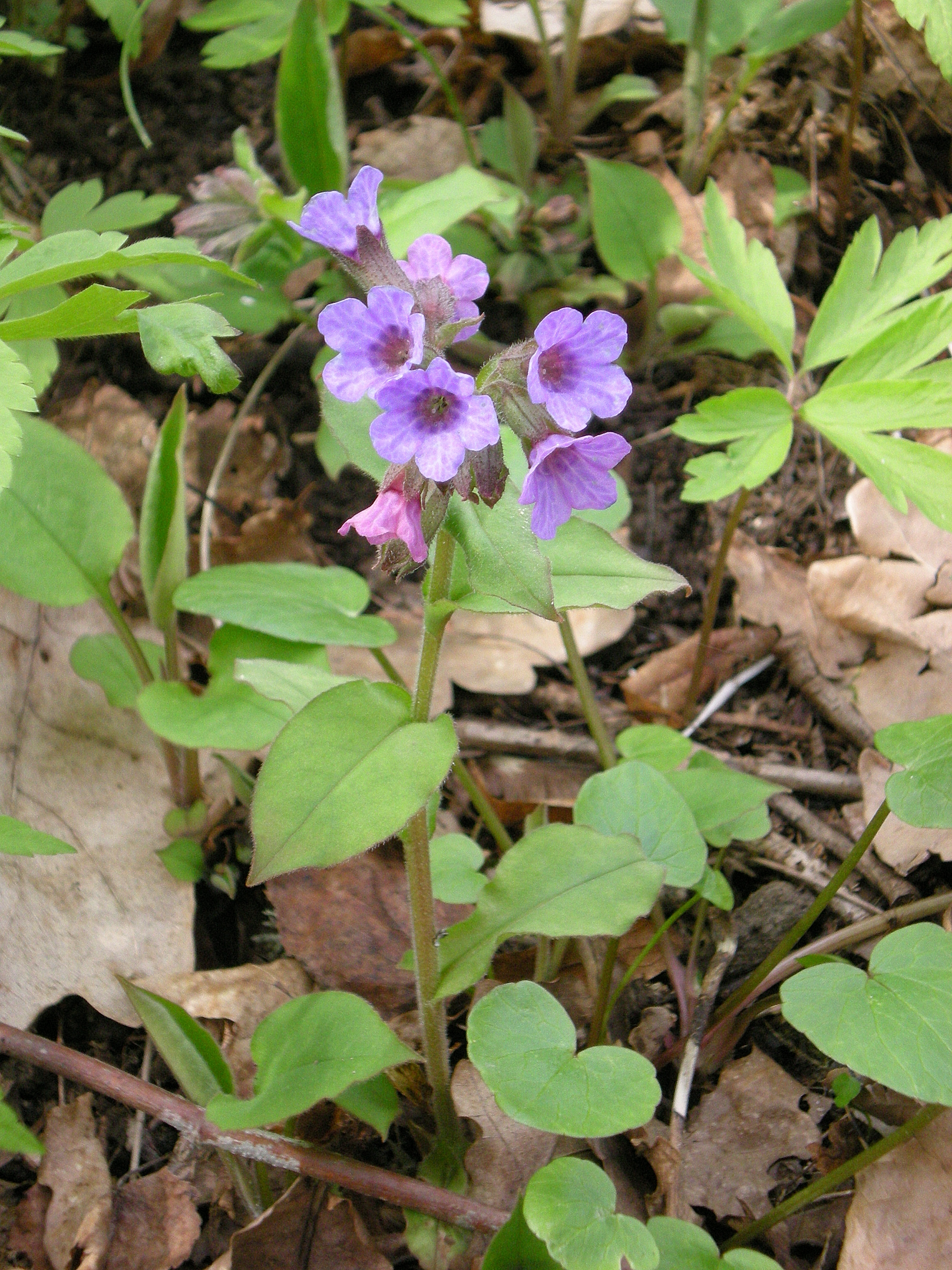
Plant of Pulmonaria officinalis

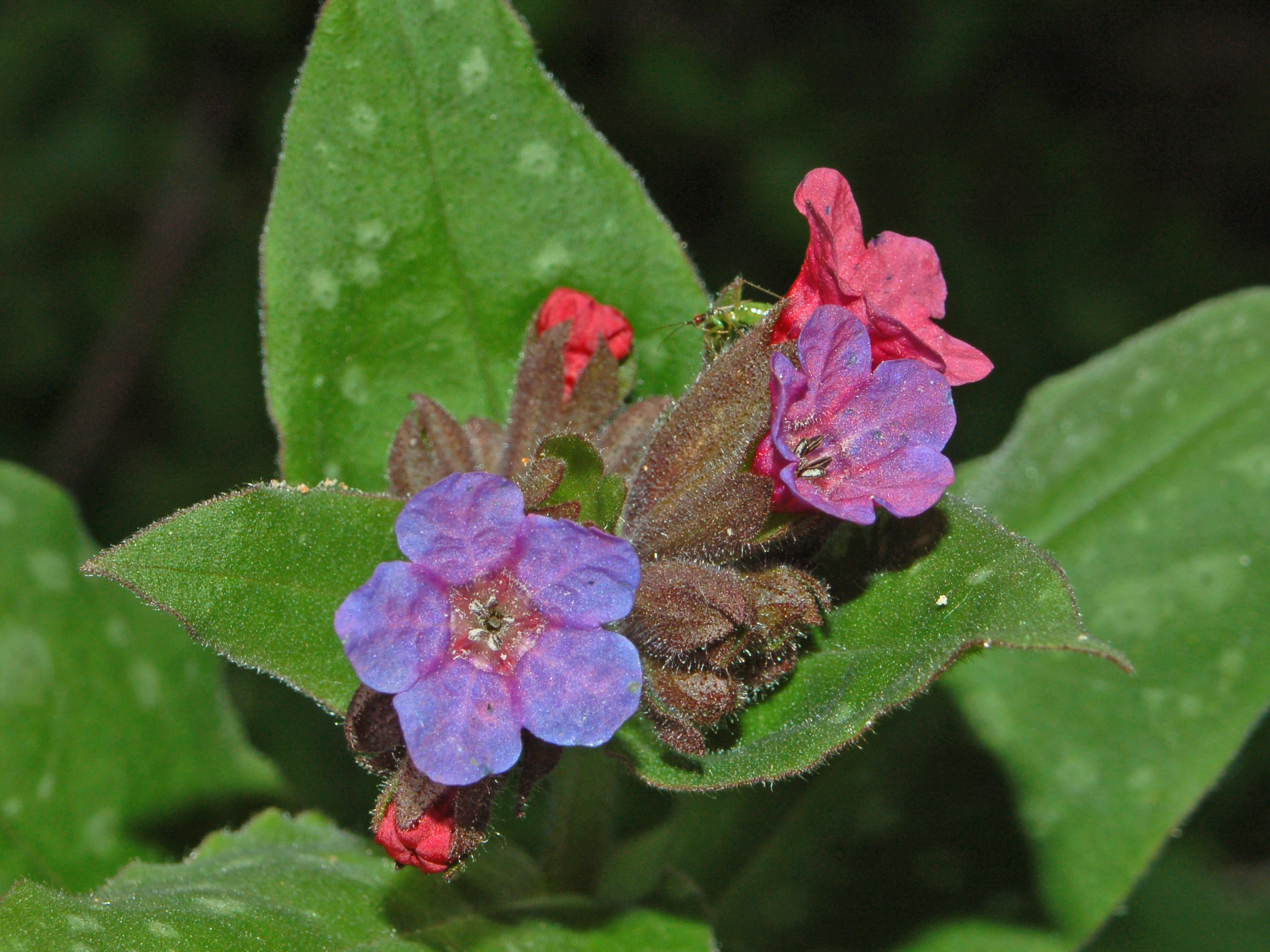
Close-up on flowers of Pulmonaria officinalis

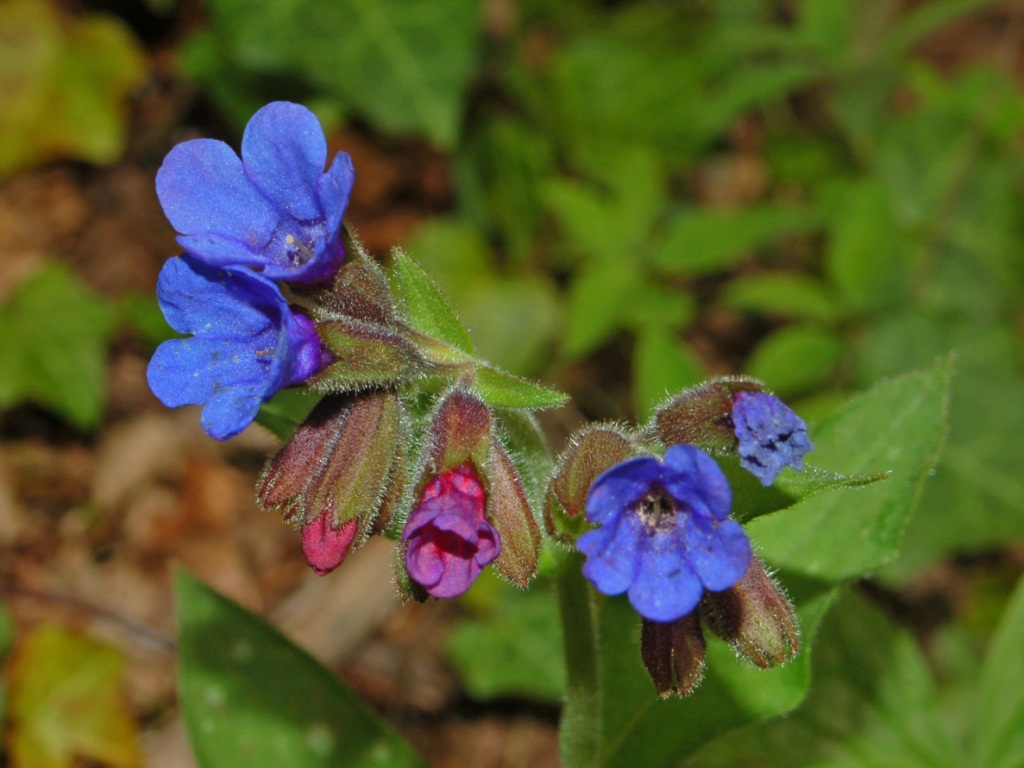
Flowers of Pulmonaria officinalis

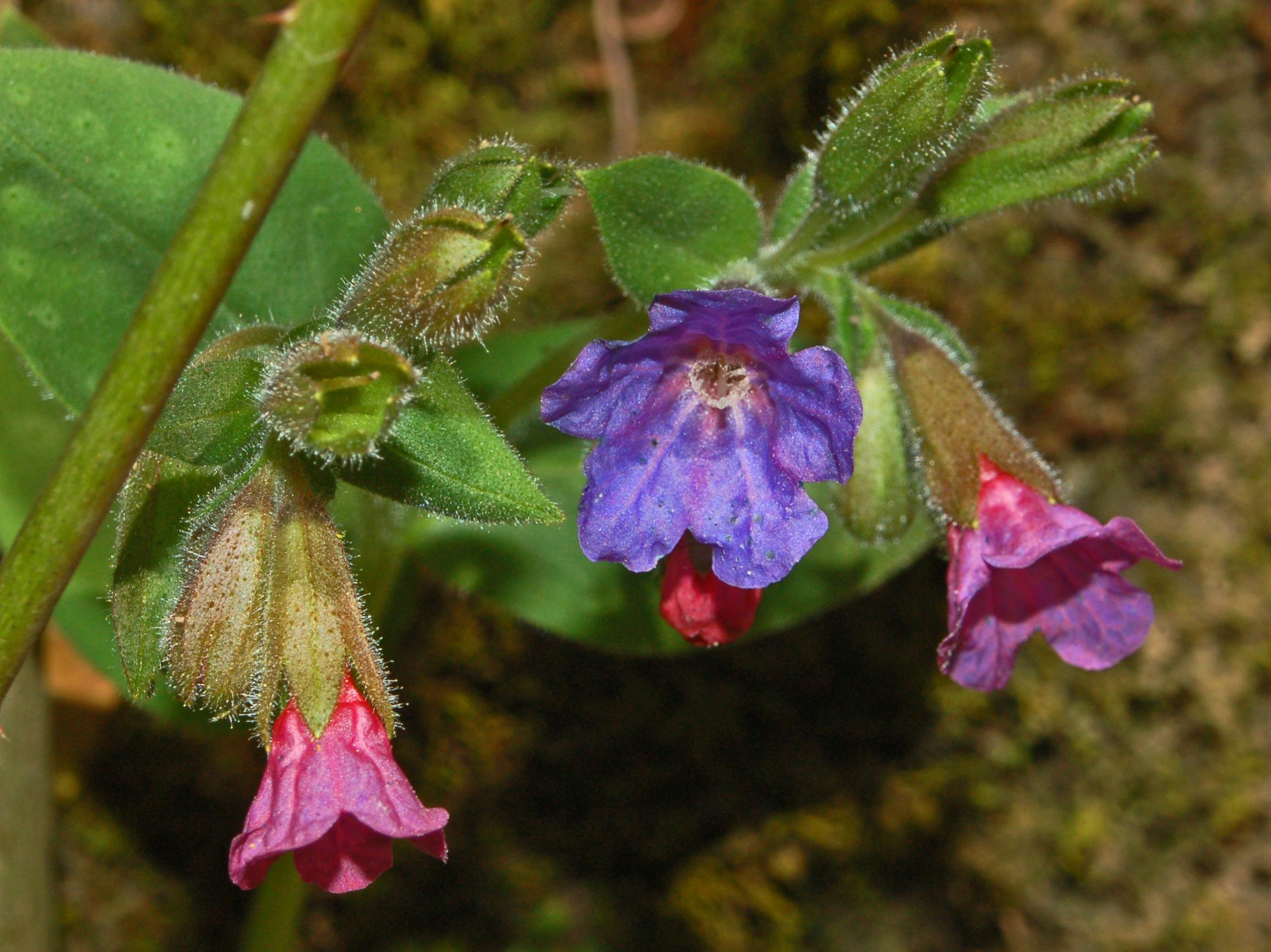
Flowers of Pulmonaria officinalis

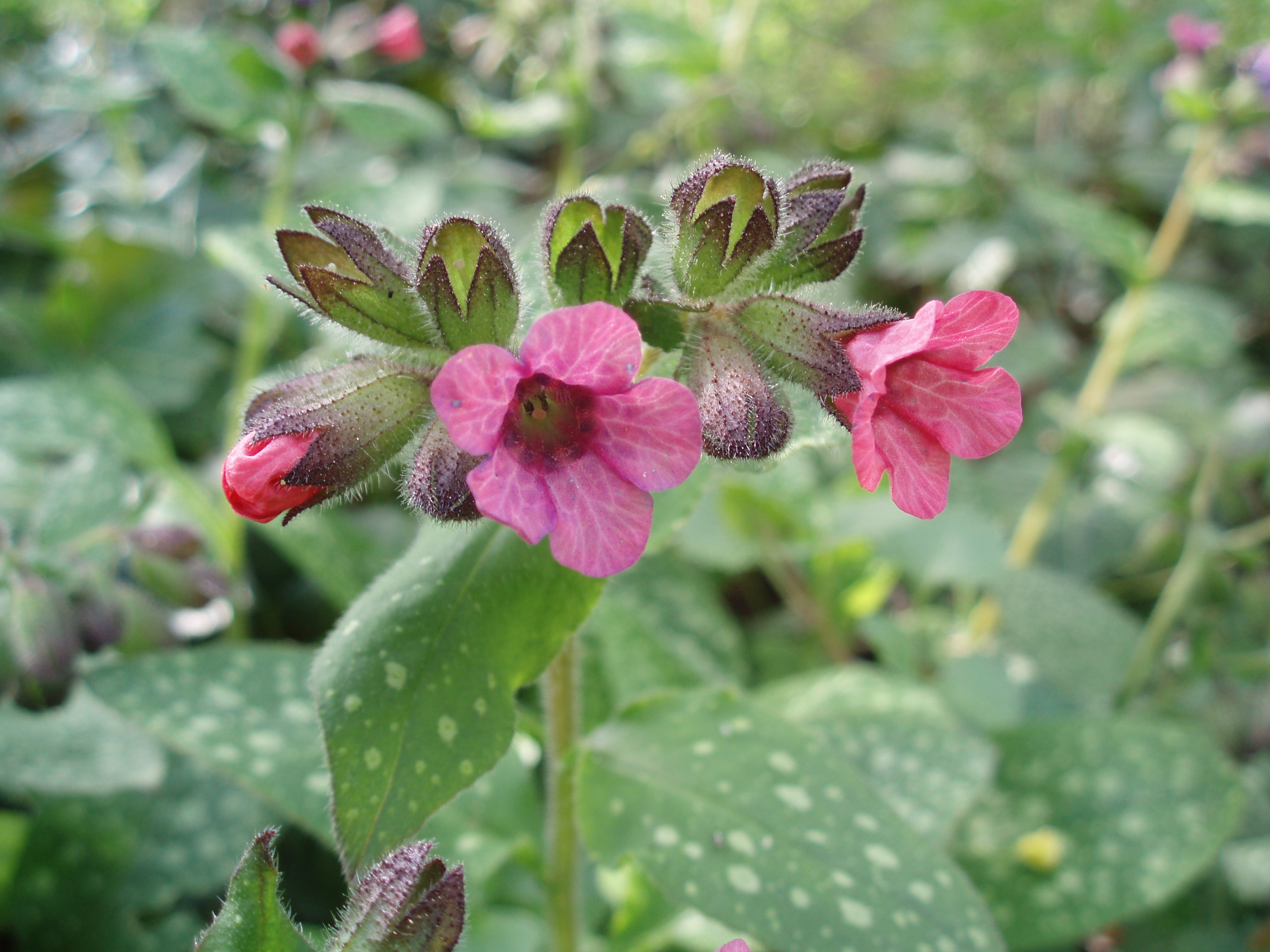
Flowers of Pulmonaria officinalis
