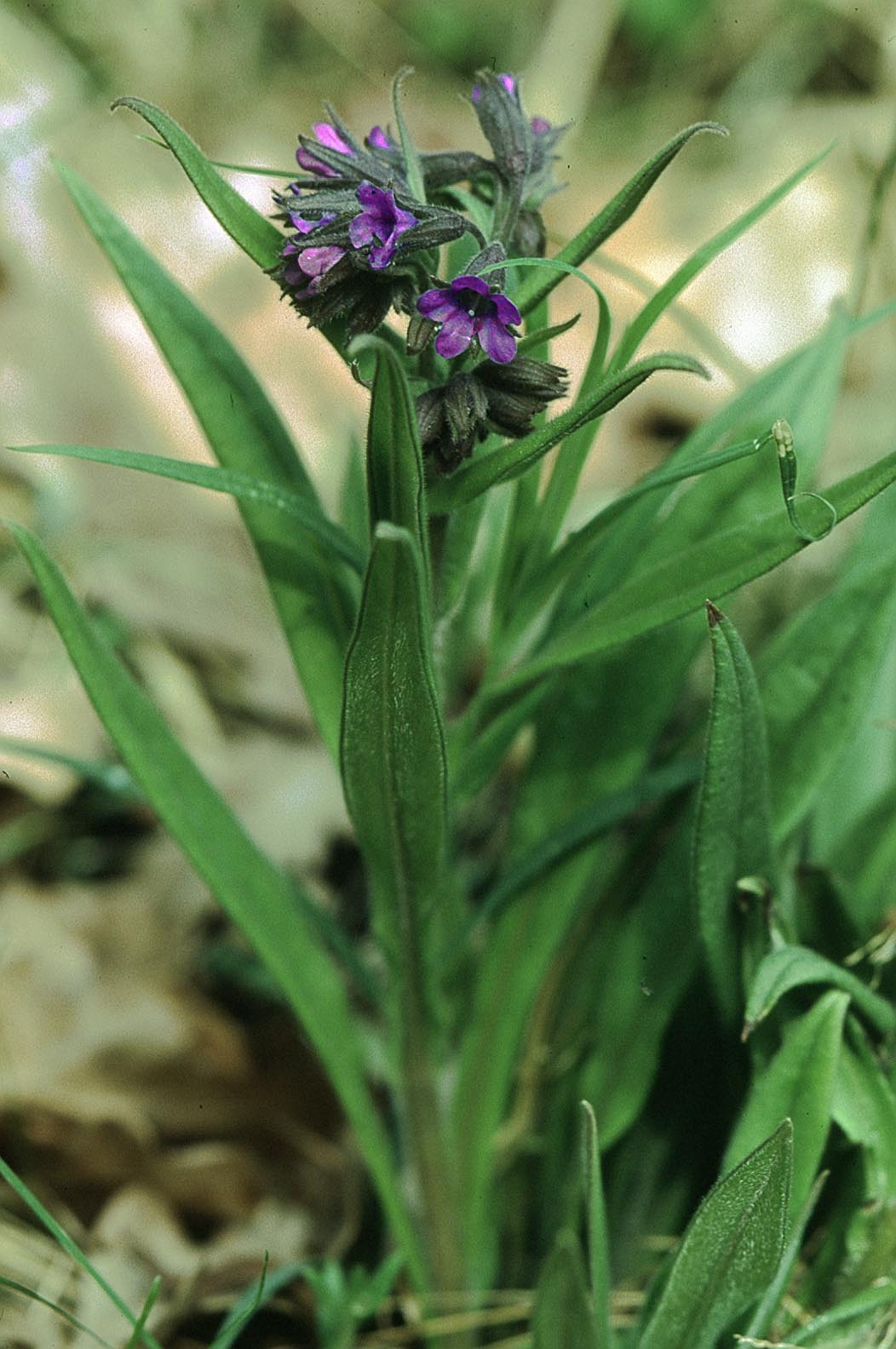

Scientific classification
- Kingdom: Plantae
- Clade: Tracheophytes
- Clade: Angiosperms
- Clade: Eudicots
- Clade: Asterids
- Order: Boraginales
- Family: Boraginaceae
- Genus: Pulmonaria
- Species: P. angustifolia

Binomial name
- Pulmonaria angustifolia L.

= Pulmonaria angustifolia =

Species of flowering plant

Pulmonaria angustifolia, the narrow-leaved lungwort or blue cowslip, is a species of flowering plant in the family Boraginaceae, native to central and north eastern Europe. Growing to 30 cm (12 in) tall by 45 cm (18 in) broad, it is an herbaceous perennial with hairy oval leaves and masses of bright blue flowers in spring. The subspecies azureus has brighter blue flowers.

The botanical Latin specific epithet angustifolia means "narrow-leaved". Despite the common name "blue cowslip" it is not closely related to the true cowslip (Primula veris).

In cultivation it prefers moist soil with dappled shade.
