= Brodiaea santarosae =

Conservation status
- Critically Imperiled (NatureServe)

Scientific classification
- Kingdom: Plantae
- Clade: Embryophytes
- Clade: Tracheophytes
- Clade: Spermatophytes
- Clade: Angiosperms
- Clade: Monocots
- Order: Asparagales
- Family: Asparagaceae
- Subfamily: Brodiaeoideae
- Genus: Brodiaea
- Species: B. santarosae

Binomial name
- Brodiaea santarosae T.J.Chester, W.P.Armstr. & Madore

Species of flowering plant

Brodiaea santarosae is a rare Brodiaea species known by the common name Santa Rosa brodiaea and Santa Rosa Basalt brodiaea. It is endemic to southern California, mostly in the region around the junction of Riverside and San Diego Counties and limited to ancient basaltic soils. There are only five known populations. It was once thought to be an intergrade of Brodiaea filifolia and Brodiaea orcuttii, but measurements found this to be false. It was described as a new species in 2006.

It is on the California Native Plant Society's list of rare and endangered species.

== Description ==
It is a perennial producing an inflorescence bearing bright purple flowers that turn white towards the base of the flower. Each flower has six spreading tepals with a center containing three stamens and staminodes, which are flat sterile stamens lying against the tepals. There is a large variation in the type of staminodes for this particular species where 10% of flowers may have no staminodes, 5-10% of flowers have short staminodes that curve backwards, and the remaining have long staminodes. The plant has corms which is how it reproduces. The overall differences in flower part lengths and pedicel length of the B. santarosae is potentially due to the surrounding plants in the area that it grows in which consist of tall grasses.

== Distribution and habitat ==
A concentration of B. santarosae can specifically be found in the Santa Rosa Basalt area which lies in Riverside County which is below San Bernardino County and above San Diego County. The flower grows between May and June in areas with elevation between 510 and 1050 meters. It is resilient to low water conditions and can even grow in disturbed habitats whereas the B. filifolia and B. orcuttii grow in habitats that are more wet. A loss of native habitat through the erosion of the Santa Rosa Basalt which has decreased by 97% is the main cause for its endangerment. There is approximately $}15km^{2$ worth of basalt and the spread of where the flower grows is equivalent to this area and likely does not exceed this area.

== Discovery ==
The B. santarosae is often confused with B. filifolia and B.orcuttii, and it was originally considered to be a hybrid of the two species but it is its own distinctive species. There is a separate species that is an actual hybrid of B. filifolia and B. orcuttii and the comparison of this hybrid species to the B. santarosae is what allowed for the B. santarosae to be described as a new species in 2006. It has 11 distinctive characteristics that differentiates itself from B. filifolia and B. orcuttii. Some characteristics include: flowers that are 40% larger than B. filifolia and B. orcutti flowers, with ovaries, inflorescence bracts, pedicels, and peduncles that are much longer, in comparison to B. filifolia and B. orcutti.
