= B. californica =

B. californica may refer to:

- Banksula californica, a harvestman species
- Bolandra californica, the Sierra bolandra or Sierra false coolwort, a flowering plant species endemic to the High Sierra Nevada of California
- Brickellia californica, the California brickellbush, a flowering plant species native to western North America from Baja California to Idaho to Oklahoma
- Brodiaea californica, the California brodiaea, a plant species native to California and Oregon

== Synonyms ==
- Bassia californica, a synonym for Kochia californica, the rusty molly, a flowering plant species native to the valleys and deserts of southeastern California
- Bipolaris californica, a synonym for Cochliobolus sativus, a fungus species which is the causal agent of a wide variety of cereal diseases
- Bombycilaena californica, a synonym for Micropus californicus, the slender cottonweed, a plant species

== See also ==
- List of Latin and Greek words commonly used in systematic names#C
