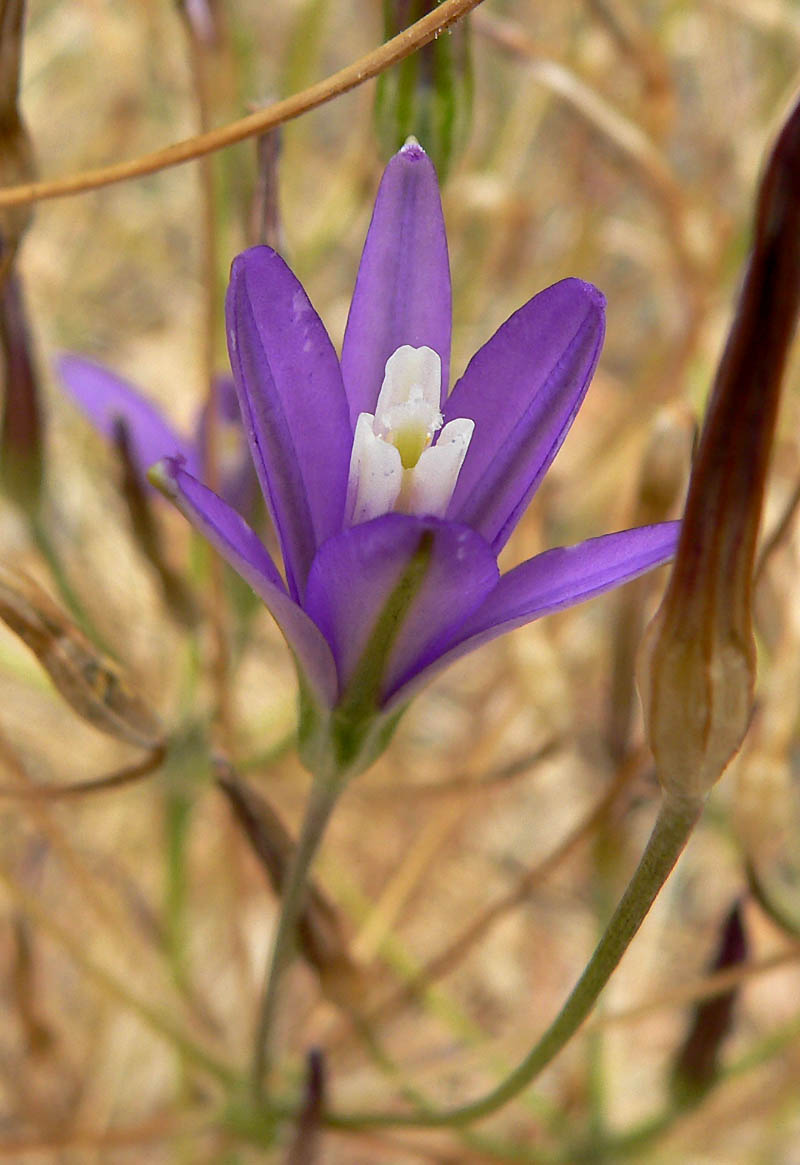
- Brodiaea californica ssp. leptandra

Scientific classification
- Kingdom: Plantae
- Clade: Tracheophytes
- Clade: Angiosperms
- Clade: Monocots
- Order: Asparagales
- Family: Asparagaceae
- Subfamily: Brodiaeoideae
- Genus: Brodiaea; Sm.

Type species
- Brodiaea coronaria (Salisb.) Jeps.

Synonyms
- Hookera Salisb., rejected name

= Brodiaea =

Cluster-lily

Genus of flowering plants

Brodiaea /ˌbroʊˈdiːə, ˌbroʊdiˈiːə/, also known by the common name cluster-lilies, is a monocot genus of flowering plants.

One school of thought places the genus in the family Themidaceae, while another school of thought places it in the subfamily Brodiaeoideae of the family Asparagaceae. The USDA Plants Database still classifies the genus Brodiaea in the family Liliaceae.

Brodiaea species occur along the Pacific Coast region of North America, from British Columbia throughout California into the Baja California Peninsula. They are especially common in northern California.

== Description ==
Brodiaea species are herbaceous perennials, growing from corms. Between one and six narrow leaves are produced from the corm. The bare flowering stem (scape) carries an umbel of flowers. Individual flowers have six blue to purple tepals, joined at the base to form a tube with free lobes at the mouth. The outer three tepal lobes are narrower than the inner three.

In almost all species, inside the tepals and joined to their bases are three sterile stamens (staminodes), resembling small petals, each opposite one of the outer tepals. Three normal stamens are also joined to the bases of the tepals and are placed opposite the inner ones. The base of the filaments of the stamens may be expanded into various shapes, such as flaps or wings. The size and shape of the staminodes and of the structures at the base of the filaments are important diagnostic characters. The compound pistil is formed of three carpels forming a superior ovary with three locules. The style which emerges between the three stamens has a three-lobed stigma. The seeds are black.

== Taxonomy ==
=== Nomenclature ===
The origin of the scientific name of the genus is somewhat tangled. Specimens of what is now called Brodiaea were first collected by Archibald Menzies, botanist to the Vancouver Expedition, in 1792. Menzies collected the plant from the vicinity of the Strait of Georgia, named "New Georgia" by George Vancouver. The first published reference to the plant did not give it a name. This was in James Edward Smith's 1807 An introduction to physiological and systematical botany, where Smith used it to argue that the tepals of liliaceous plants are sepals rather than petals:

"I cannot conceal a recent discovery which strongly confirms the opinion of my acute and candid friend. Two species of a new genus, found by Mr. Menzies on the West coast of North America, have beautiful liliaceous flowers like an Agapanthus, with six internal petals besides!"

The following year, early in 1808, Richard Salisbury published a description of the first Brodiaea species in The Paradisus Londinensis, naming it Hookera coronaria, the genus name being in honour of the illustrator William Hooker. Shortly afterwards, Smith named a moss genus Hookeria, and in April 1808, he read to the Linnean Society of London a formal description of a new genus, based on the same species as Salisbury's Hookera coronaria, naming the genus Brodiaea in honour of Scottish botanist James Brodie. Formal publication did not occur, however, until Smith's presentation went to print in 1810. George Boulger, writing in the Dictionary of National Biography, says that Smith's actions were deliberately intended to deprive Salisbury of credit for the genus.

If this was Smith's intention it was successful, since although Salisbury's genus name Hookera has priority over Smith's name Brodiaea, names as similar as Hookera and Hookeria are considered to be confusing and a formal proposal to conserve the names Brodiaea and Hookeria over the name Hookera was accepted. Brodiaea is thus a "conserved name" or "nomen conservandum", shown by the abbreviation "nom. cons." after the name in botanical sources. The type species is now Brodiaea coronaria, and the original type, Brodiaea grandiflora Sm., is an illegitimate name.

=== Phylogeny and classification ===
Brodiaea belongs to a group of 12 genera whose affinities were the subject of much controversy until the end of the 20th century. Salisbury treated them as a family which he named Themidaceae. Others placed this group at lower taxonomic rank and usually included them in Liliaceae, Alliaceae, or Amaryllidaceae. Molecular phylogenetic studies confirmed the suspicions of many that this group was misplaced, and consequently, the family Themidaceae was resurrected in 1996. When the Angiosperm Phylogeny Group published the APG II system in 2003, Themidaceae was accepted as an optional family for those who wanted to circumscribe families narrowly in the order Asparagales. When the APG III system was published in 2009, the former Themidaceae was treated as a subfamily, Brodiaeoideae, of the family Asparagaceae sensu lato.

Some sources, such as ITIS, continue to use the polyphyletic groups of obsolete taxonomic systems. Other sources, such as the Angiosperm Phylogeny Website mostly follow the Angiosperm Phylogeny Group.

Brodiaea (or brodeia) is also used as a common name to refer to three genera, Brodiaea, Dichelostemma, and Triteleia. The latter two genera were once included as part of the genus Brodiaea. The monophyly of Brodiaea as presently defined is not entirely certain. It might be intermixed with Dichelostemma.

=== Species ===
As of April 2026, the World Checklist of Selected Plant Families lists the following 18 species. English common names are from the Flora of North America.

Image	Name	Distribution
	Brodiaea appendiculata Hoover - appendage cluster-lily	central California
	Brodiaea californica Lindl. ex Lem. - California cluster-lily	northern California, southwestern Oregon
	Brodiaea coronaria (Salisb.) Jeps. - harvest cluster-lily; Californian hyacinth	British Columbia, Washington, Oregon, much of California
	Brodiaea elegans Hoover - elegant cluster-lily	western Oregon, most of California
	Brodiaea filifolia S.Watson - threadleaf cluster-lily	southern California
	Brodiaea insignis (Jeps.) Niehaus - Kaweah cluster-lily	Tulare County
	Brodiaea jolonensis Eastw. - chaparral cluster-lily	southern California, northern Baja California
	Brodiaea kinkiensis Niehaus - San Clemente Island cluster-lily	San Clemente Island
	Brodiaea matsonii R.E.Preston	Shasta County
	Brodiaea minor (Benth.) S.Watson (syn. Brodiaea purdyi Eastw.) - vernalpool cluster-lily	northern California
	Brodiaea nana Hoover	northern California
	Brodiaea orcuttii (Greene) Baker - Orcutt's cluster-lily	southern California, northern Baja California
	Brodiaea pallida Hoover - Chinese Camp cluster-lily	Calaveras and Tuolumne Counties
	Brodiaea rosea (Greene) Baker	Indian Valley Brodiaea - Glenn County
	Brodiaea santarosae T.J.Chester	Santa Rosa basalt brodiaea - Riverside and San Diego Counties
	Brodiaea sierrae R.E.Preston	Butte, Yuba and Nevada Counties
	Brodiaea stellaris S.Watson - starflower cluster-lily	Sonoma, Mendocino and Humboldt Counties
	Brodiaea terrestris Kellogg - dwarf cluster-lily	southwestern Oregon and much of coastal and southern California

=== Formerly included ===
Numerous other names have been coined using the name Brodiaea, referring to species now regarded as better suited to other genera (Androstephium, Beauverdia, Dandya, Dichelostemma, Leucocoryne, Nothoscordum, Tristagma, Triteleia, and Triteleiopsis).

== Distribution and habitat ==
Brodiaea species are confined to western North America, from British Columbia in the north, through the West Coast of the United States region, to northwestern Mexico in the south. The majority of species are endemic to California.

Many are adapted to serpentine soils or other soils with particular chemical compositions, resulting in limited distributions and several rare and endangered species. An example is Brodiaea pallida, known only from two populations along the border between Tuolumne County and Calaveras County, California.

== Cultivation ==
A number of species of Brodiaea are in cultivation. Species such as B. californica and B. coronaria are recommended for sunny positions in the garden, where they extend the flowering season of most ornamental bulbs, flowering in early summer rather than in spring. The flower heads (umbels) of larger species can be dried for use as winter decorations. Smaller species, such as B. terrestris, may be grown in a bulb frame or alpine house.

== Gallery ==
Brodiæa Ixioides, also known as Ixia-like Brodiæa, botanical print from the Curtis's Botanical Magazine, 1823. Copper engraving by Weddell from an illustration by J Curtis.
