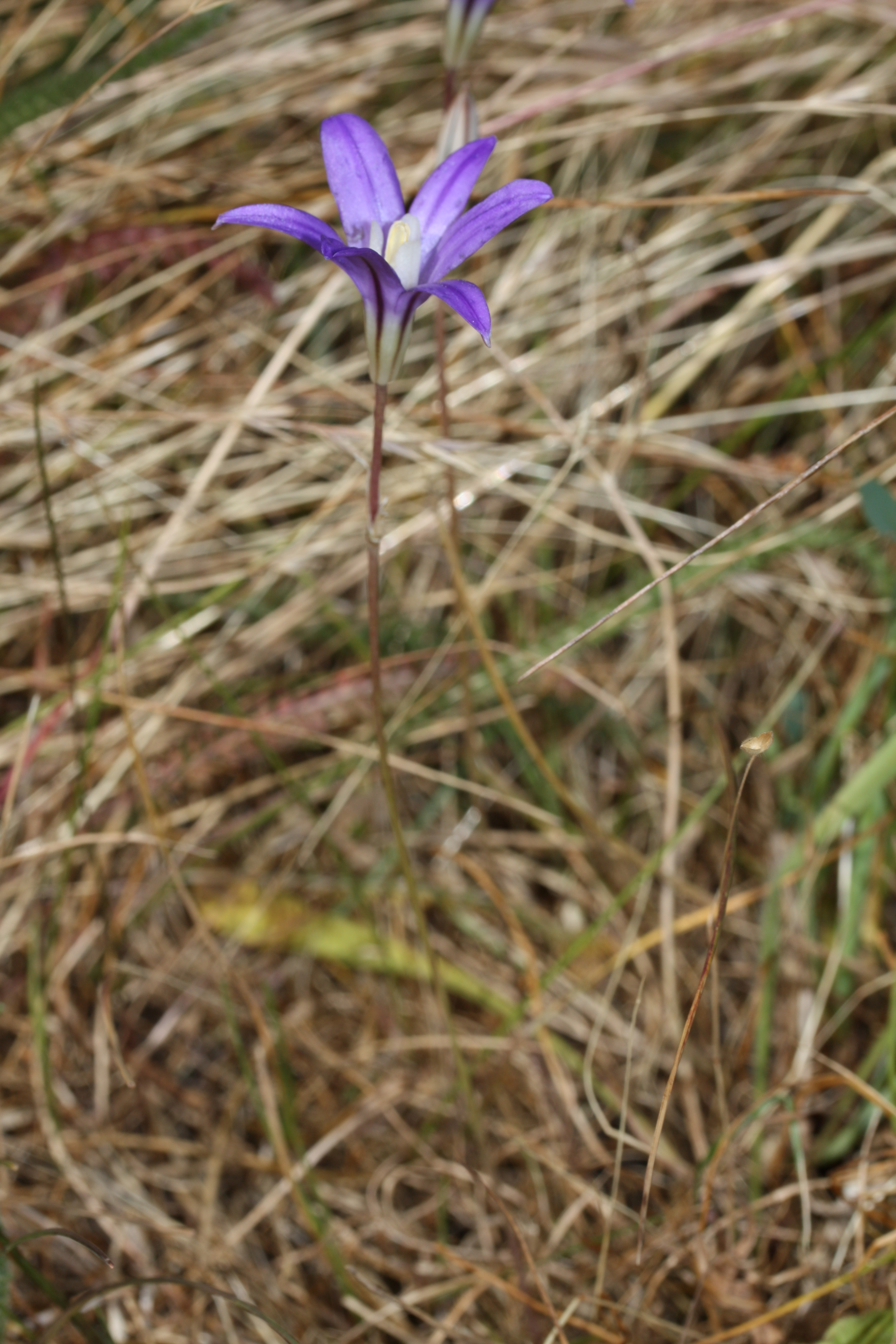
- Specimen in Washington state

Scientific classification
- Kingdom: Plantae
- Clade: Tracheophytes
- Clade: Angiosperms
- Clade: Monocots
- Order: Asparagales
- Family: Asparagaceae
- Subfamily: Brodiaeoideae
- Genus: Brodiaea
- Species: B. coronaria

Binomial name
- Brodiaea coronaria (Salisb.) Jeps.

Subspecies
- Brodiaea coronaria subsp. coronaria Brodiaea coronaria subsp. rosea

Synonyms
- See text.

= Brodiaea coronaria =

Species of tree

Brodiaea coronaria is the type species of Brodiaea and also known by the common names harvest brodiaea and crown brodiaea. It is native to western North America from British Columbia to northern California, where it grows in mountains and grasslands.

== Description ==
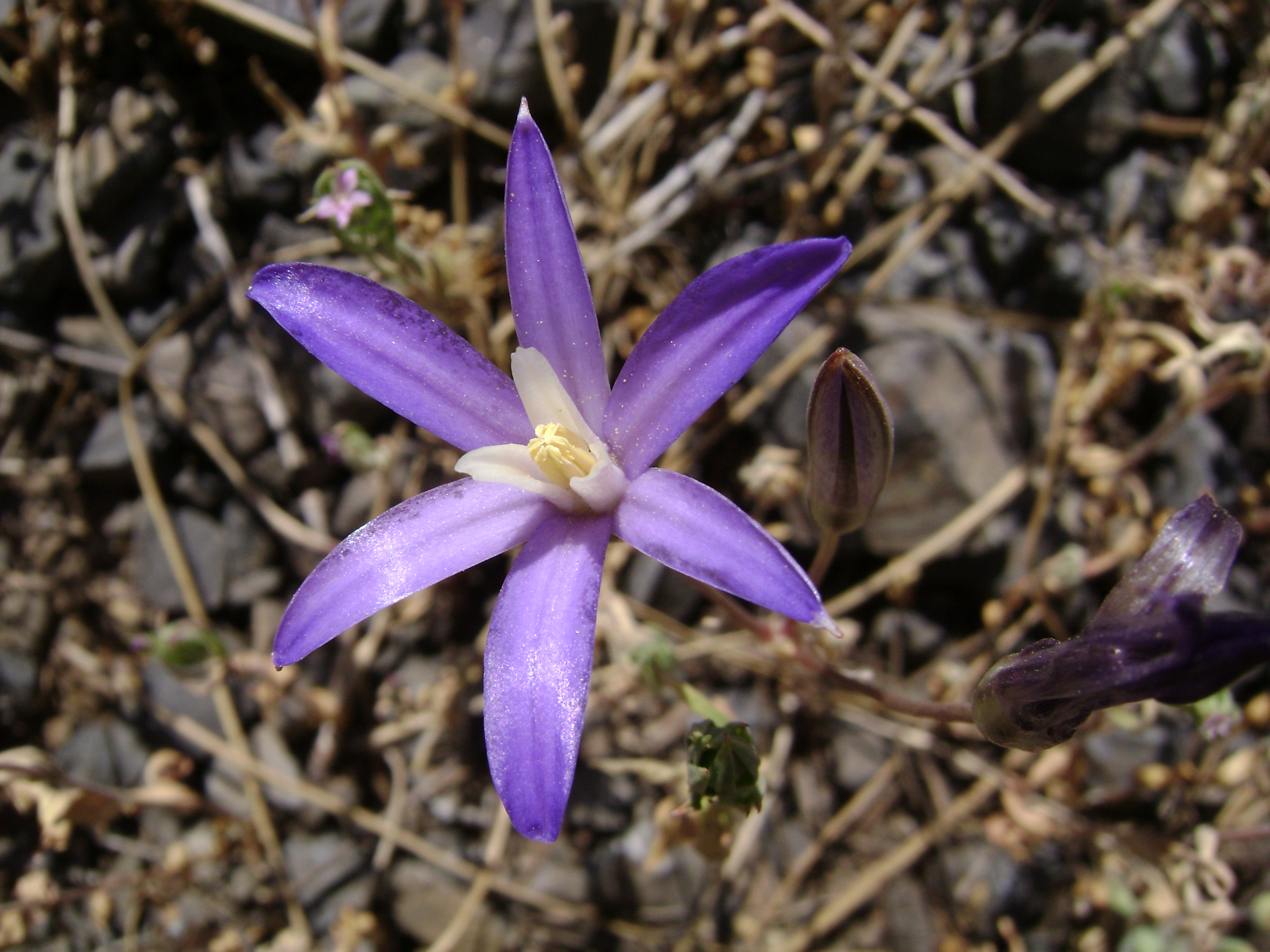
Close-up of flower

Brodiaea coronaria is a perennial herb growing from a corm and producing an erect inflorescence with a few basal leaves. The inflorescence is up to about 25 centimeters (10 inches) tall and bears lilylike flowers on an array of pedicels.

Each flower is a tube several centimeters long opening into a bell-shaped corolla of six bright purple lobes each up to 3 cm (1 in) long. In the center are three stamens and whitish sterile stamens known as staminodes.

== Taxonomy ==
=== Nomenclature ===
The history of the scientific name of this species is somewhat tangled. The plant was first collected by Archibald Menzies during the Vancouver Expedition, and published as Hookera coronaria by Richard Salisbury in Paradisus Londinensis early in 1808. However, Salisbury had fallen out with fellow botanist James Edward Smith. Smith first published a moss genus, Hookeria, and then published a description of Salisbury's Hookera coronaria as Brodiaea grandiflora.

If it was Smith's intention to replace Salisbury's name, as has been suggested, it was partly successful, since although Salisbury's Hookera coronaria has priority over Smith's Brodiaea grandiflora, names as similar as Hookera and Hookeria are considered to be confusing and a formal proposal to conserve the names Brodiaea and Hookeria over the name Hookera was accepted. However, Salisbury's epithet coronaria still stands since Smith's Brodiaea grandiflora is now considered to have been an illegitimate name when published. In 1917, after the Kew Rule had vanished from botanical nomenclature, Willis Jepson formally published the combination Brodiaea coronaria, now accepted as the botanical name for this species.

=== Synonyms ===
Synonyms, in full or in part, include:

- Hookera coronaria Salisb. (basionym)
- Hookera grandiflora (Sm.) Kuntze
- Brodiaea grandiflora Sm.
- Hookera rosea Greene
- Brodiaea rosea (Greene) Baker

=== Subspecies ===
There are two subspecies of this plant:

- Brodiaea coronaria subsp. coronaria – crown brodiaea
- Brodiaea coronaria subsp. rosea – Indian Valley brodiaea; a rare pink-flowered subspecies endemic to a small region in the Inner North California Coast Ranges (Tehama, Glenn, and Lake Counties) in northwestern California.

== Uses ==
Native Americans and early European settlers of the continent harvested the small bulbs for food. They are edible raw, with a nutty or celery-like taste.
