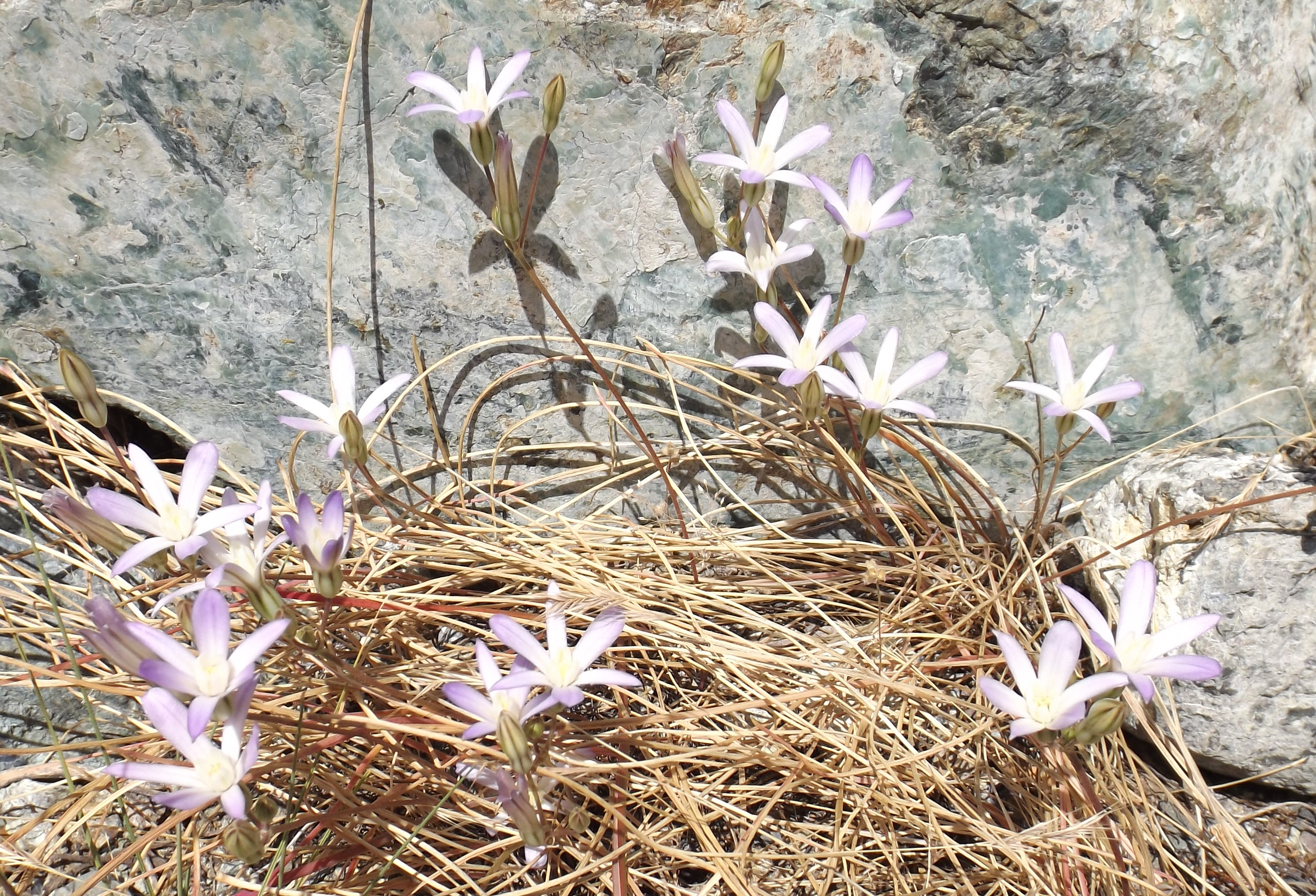

Conservation status
- Critically Imperiled (NatureServe)

- Threatened (ESA)

Scientific classification
- Kingdom: Plantae
- Clade: Tracheophytes
- Clade: Angiosperms
- Clade: Monocots
- Order: Asparagales
- Family: Asparagaceae
- Subfamily: Brodiaeoideae
- Genus: Brodiaea
- Species: B. pallida

Binomial name
- Brodiaea pallida Hoover

= Brodiaea pallida =

Species of flowering plant

Brodiaea pallida is a rare species of flowering plant in the cluster-lily genus known by the common name Chinese Camp brodiaea.

== Distribution ==
Brodiaea pallida is endemic to California, where it is known from a two populations along the border between Tuolumne and Calaveras Counties.

The first population is at the type locality near Chinese Camp and contains a varying number of individuals which has been estimated at 600 to 5000. This population is limited to a 65-acre (26 ha) tract of land which is privately owned. The plant was federally listed as a threatened species in 1998. In the year 2000, a second population was discovered 24 kilometres (15 mi) away, and it may contain up to 10,000 individuals. The species is threatened by development of its habitat.

== Description ==
Brodiaea pallida is a perennial producing an inflorescence up to about 20 centimetres (7.9 in) tall bearing pale purple flowers on short pedicels. Each flower has six strongly curving tepals about a centimeter long. In the center of the flower are three erect white, notch-tipped sterile stamens called staminodes, each about as long as the tepals. Within these are the fertile stamens. Flowering occurs in late May and early June.

== Conservation ==
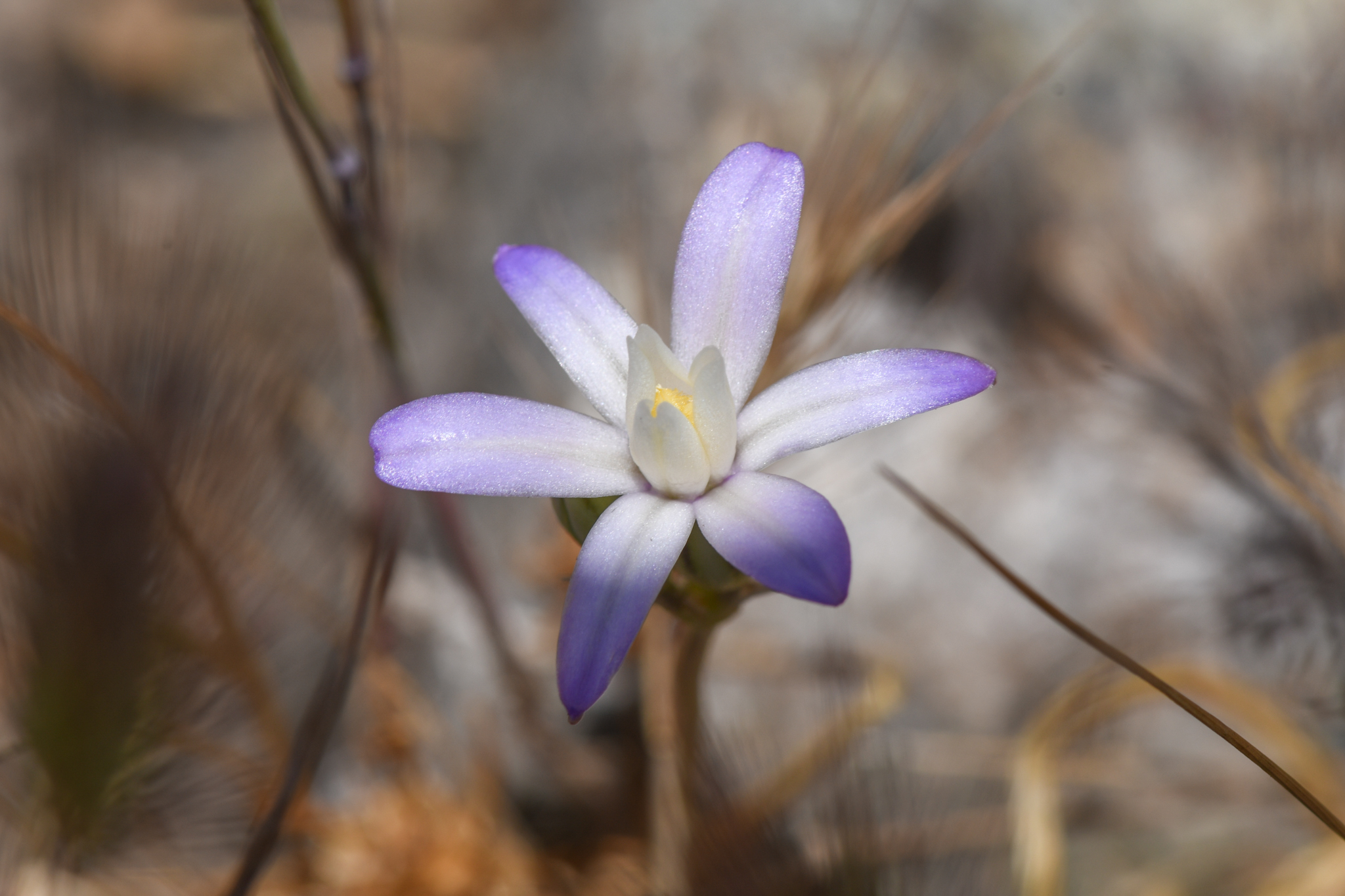
Close-up of a Brodiaea pallida flower

This plant grows in mixed soils of volcanic and serpentine origin in vernally moist areas of grassland next to intermittent streams. At the time it was placed on the endangered species list, it was known only from a strip of land under 0.8 kilometres (0.50 mi) long and just 6 metres (20 ft) wide, and was at risk for extinction from any one destructive event. The population had been fragmented and part was destroyed by construction activity in 1982. It was listed as a threatened species rather than an endangered species because no further disturbance was planned for the area at the time. The second population is also located on privately owned land. It is on the outskirts of the town of Copperopolis, and it is in a zone slated for residential construction. Even if development does not occur at the locations of the plants, development activity nearby could still affect them by altering the flow of the streams, increasing runoff, or encouraging development of roads and firebreaks.

The genetic variability of the populations is unknown because it reproduces vegetatively by cloning as well as sexually by seed.
