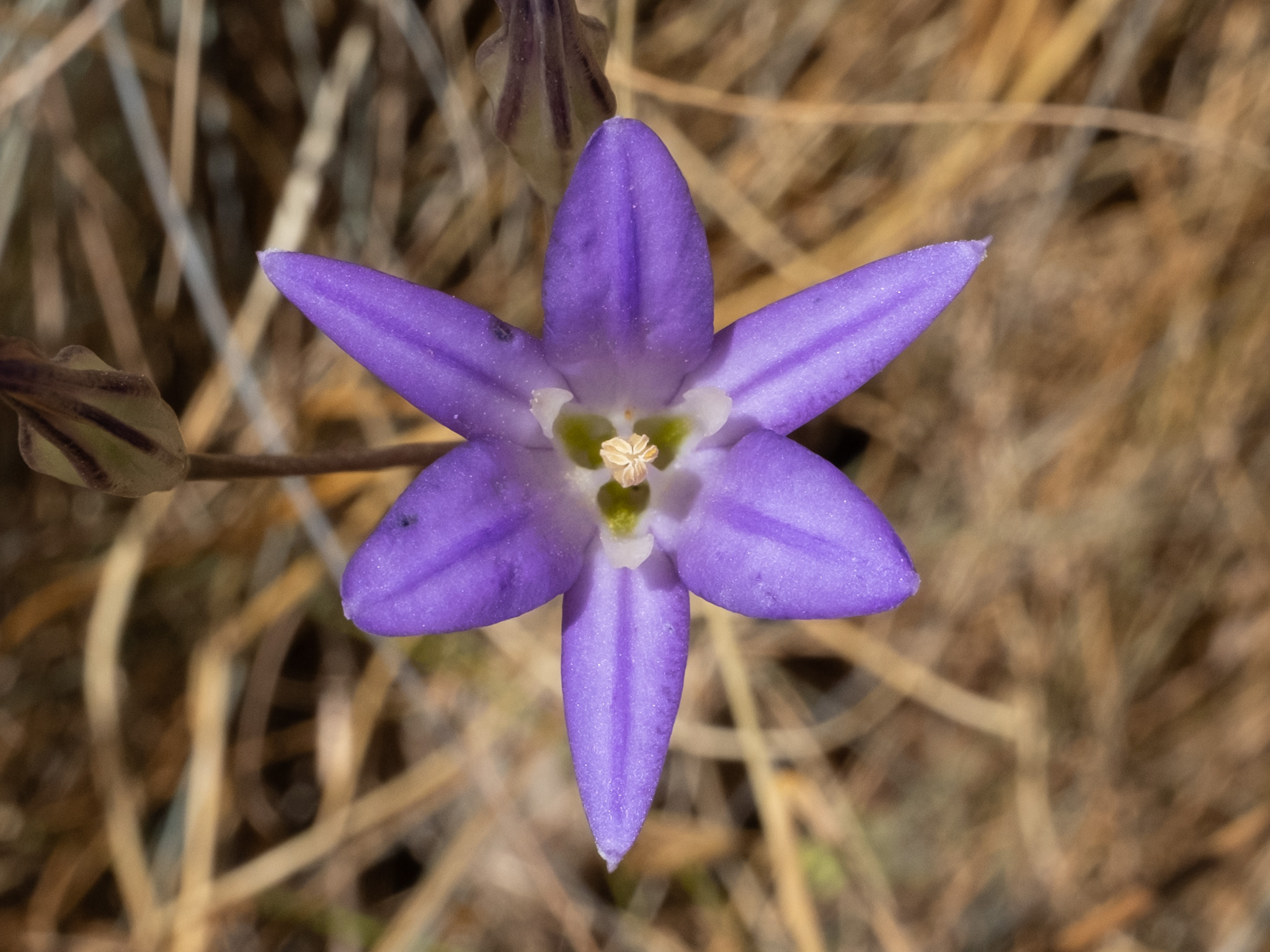

Scientific classification
- Kingdom: Plantae
- Clade: Tracheophytes
- Clade: Angiosperms
- Clade: Monocots
- Order: Asparagales
- Family: Asparagaceae
- Subfamily: Brodiaeoideae
- Genus: Brodiaea
- Species: B. elegans

Binomial name
- Brodiaea elegans Hoover

Subspecies
- Brodiaea elegans var. australis Hoover, 1957; Brodiaea elegans subsp. elegans; Brodiaea elegans subsp. hooveri T.F. Niehaus, 1971; Brodiaea elegans var. mundula (Jeps.) Hoover, 1939

= Brodiaea elegans =

Species of flowering plant

Brodiaea elegans is a species of flowering plant in the cluster-lily genus known by the common names harvest brodiaea, elegant brodiaea, and elegant cluster-lily.

The bulb is native to the mountain ranges of California and Oregon, where it grows in woodlands and meadows.

== Description ==
Brodiaea elegans is a perennial that produces a stout stemlike inflorescence up to 50 centimeters tall. It bears showy flowers on pedicels up to 10 centimeters long.

Each flower has six curving tepals up to 3 centimeters long in shades of bright purple. In the center of the flower are white or pale purple sterile stamens known as staminodes; these are flat with pointed or toothed tips and between one half and one centimeter in length. Next to these are the fertile stamens topped with large anthers.

In Northern California, Brodiaea elegans is one of the later blooming wildflowers, often seen in May.
