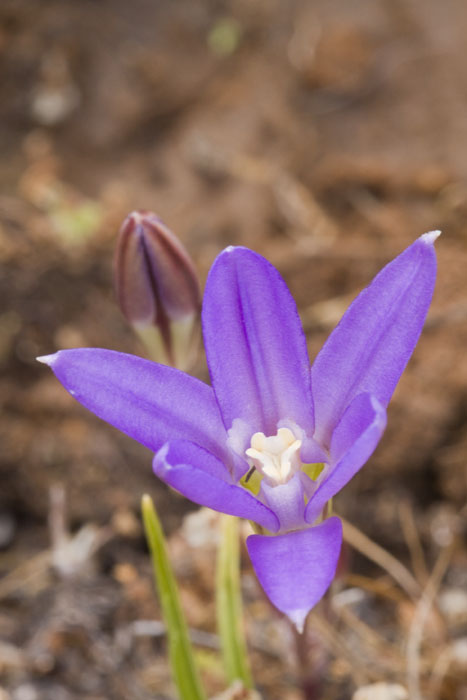
- Brodiaea jolonensis flower

Conservation status
- Vulnerable (NatureServe)

Scientific classification
- Kingdom: Plantae
- Clade: Embryophytes
- Clade: Tracheophytes
- Clade: Spermatophytes
- Clade: Angiosperms
- Clade: Monocots
- Order: Asparagales
- Family: Asparagaceae
- Subfamily: Brodiaeoideae
- Genus: Brodiaea
- Species: B. jolonensis

Binomial name
- Brodiaea jolonensis Eastw.

= Brodiaea jolonensis =

Species of flowering plant

Brodiaea jolonensis, known by the common name chaparral brodiaea, is a species of flowering plant in the cluster-lily family.

The bulb is native to the coast and coastal mountain ranges of the southern half of California and of northern Baja California. Locations

== Description ==
Brodiaea jolonensis is a perennial herbaceous cormous geophyte, whose above-ground growth dies back after flowering, becoming dormant and allowing the corm to store water and nutrients. It regrows from the corm the following year, producing an inflorescence up to about 15 centimetres (5.9 inches) tall bearing blue-purple flowers on pedicels a few centimeters long.

The bisexual flowers grow to 14–24 millimetres (0.55–0.94 in). Pedicels grow 1–4 cm (0.39–1.57 in) long. Each flower has six curving tepals between 1 and 2 centimeters in length. The blue-violet perianth grows to 19.5–25 mm (0.77–0.98 in), with a 7.5–9 mm (0.30–0.35 in) tube that is cylindrical or narrowly campanulate, thick, opaque, not splitting in fruit, with 12–16 mm (0.47–0.63 in) long ascending lobes, recurved distally; outer lobes are 4–5.5 mm (0.16–0.22 in) wide and the inner ones are 5–7 mm (0.20–0.28 in) wide.

The center of the flower contains three fertile stamina ringed by three prominent staminodes. The stamina's filament has a dilated base that is fused with the staminodes and measures 1.5–3 mm (0.059–0.118 in) long. The anther measures 4–6 mm (0.16–0.24 in), tipped with a V-shaped notch at the apex. The violet-colored staminodes lean inward toward the stamen, growing 7–8 mm (0.28–0.31 in); they are broad up to the apex, a quarter involute or incurved, with hooded tips and slight notches.

The ovary, measuring 5–7 mm (0.20–0.28 in), is purple or light purple in color, has a 4.5–7 mm (0.18–0.28 in) style.

== Taxonomy ==
The species Brodiaea jolonensis was described by Canadian-American botanist Alice Eastwood in her article New Species in Liliaceae, published in July 1938 in the seventh issue of the second volume of Leaflets of Western Botany, a journal owned and published by herself and John Thomas Howell.

The type specimen was collected in May, 1915, at Jolon, Monterey County, California by a Mrs. Starr. Another specimen used for Eastwood's description was collected by herself and Howell at Jolon in May 9, 1936.

=== Etymology ===
Its generic name Brodiaea (BRO-dee-a) is named after James Brodie, a Scottish botanist who was an associate of English botanist James Edward Smith who published the genus. The specific epithet jolonensis, meaning "of Jolon," is presumably named after the community of Jolon or the Jolon Valley; for its part, jolon (pronounced ho-lone in English) is derived from xolon, a Salinan language word meaning "valley of dead trees".

== Distribution and habitat ==
B. jolonensis is native and endemic to the south and central coast regions of California and northern Baja California, growing in elevations of 45–1,490 metres (150–4,890 feet). In these regions, it is present in the southern California Coast Ranges, the Transverse Ranges, the Peninsular Ranges. In the Channel Islands of California, it grows on the islands of Santa Cruz, Santa Rosa and Santa Catalina.

It grows in valley grasslands and coastal prairies, clay flats, foothill woodlands, chaparrals, and sagebrush scrubs.

== Ecology ==
B. jolonensis flowers in spring, from April to May or June.

It grows in loam, sandy loam, sandy and slow-draining soils with a minimum soil depth of 8 in (20 cm). It tolerates acidic to slightly alkaline soils with a pH tolerance ranging from 5.5 to 7.8. It does not tolerate saline soils, growing in soils with a maximum salinity of 1.1 μmhos/cm.

The plants are tolerant of very low water, growing in locations with wet seasons ranging from 3 to 7 months long and annual precipitation within ranges of 16–49 in (41–124 cm). The temperature range of its habitats is of −3–15 °C (27–59 °F), with average December lows of 0 °C (32 °F) and average July highs of 33 °C (91 °F), placing their hardiness zones from 8B to 10B. The growing season of regions where this plant grows ranges from 4 to 12 months a year.

In their habitats, they support butterflies.

== Use ==
The corms are edible and are part of the traditional cuisine of some indigenous people in California.
