= B. terrestris =

B. terrestris may refer to:

- Blepharospora terrestris, a plant pathogen species
- Bombus terrestris, a bumblebee species
- Brodiaea terrestris, a plant species
- Bufo terrestris, a toad species

== See also ==
- Terrestris
