= Brodiaea nana =

Scientific classification
- Kingdom: Plantae
- Clade: Tracheophytes
- Clade: Angiosperms
- Clade: Monocots
- Order: Asparagales
- Family: Asparagaceae
- Subfamily: Brodiaeoideae
- Genus: Brodiaea
- Species: B. nana

Binomial name
- Brodiaea nana Hoover

Synonyms
- Brodiaea minor var. nana (Hoover) Hoover

Species of flowering plant

Brodiaea nana is a species of plant in the subfamily Brodiaeoideae. It is endemic to the Sierra Nevada.
