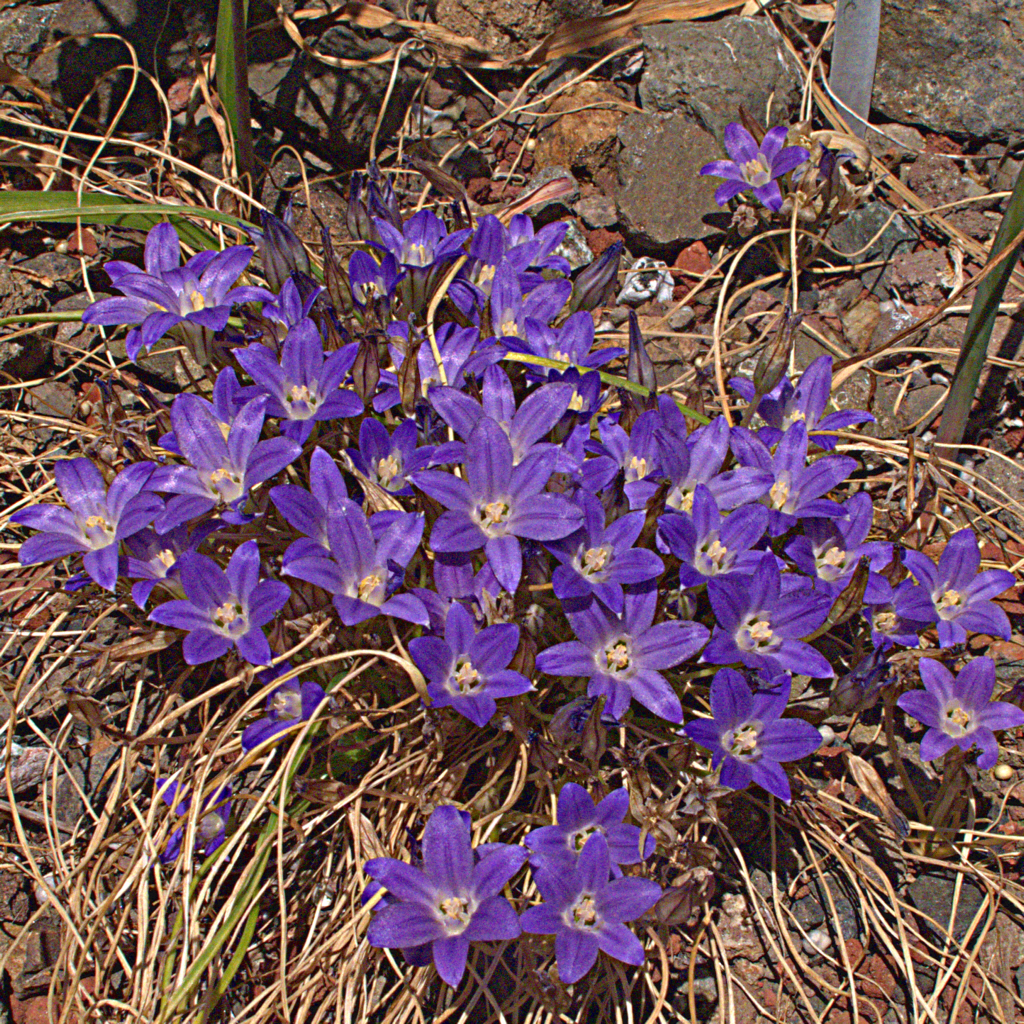

Conservation status
- Apparently Secure (NatureServe)

Scientific classification
- Kingdom: Plantae
- Clade: Tracheophytes
- Clade: Angiosperms
- Clade: Monocots
- Order: Asparagales
- Family: Asparagaceae
- Subfamily: Brodiaeoideae
- Genus: Brodiaea
- Species: B. minor

Binomial name
- Brodiaea minor (Benth.) S.Wats.

= Brodiaea minor =

Species of flowering plant

Brodiaea minor is a species of flowering plant in the cluster-lily genus known by the common names dwarf brodiaea and vernalpool brodiaea.

The bulb is endemic to central California, where it grows in the grassland habitat of the Central Valley and adjacent Sierra Nevada foothills.

== Description ==
Brodiaea minor is a small perennial producing an erect inflorescence up to 10 centimeters tall which bears light purple flowers on short pedicels. Each flower is urn-shaped with narrow, spreading tepals 1 to 2 centimeters long. In the center of the flower are three fertile stamens and three prominent, protruding sterile stamens known as staminodes.
