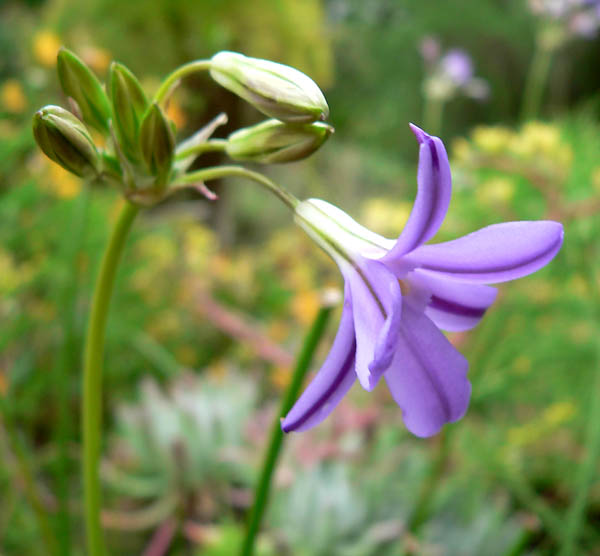

Conservation status
- Imperiled (NatureServe)

Scientific classification
- Kingdom: Plantae
- Clade: Tracheophytes
- Clade: Angiosperms
- Clade: Monocots
- Order: Asparagales
- Family: Asparagaceae
- Subfamily: Brodiaeoideae
- Genus: Brodiaea
- Species: B. kinkiensis

Binomial name
- Brodiaea kinkiensis T.F.Niehaus (1966) Source: IPNI, NRCS

= Brodiaea kinkiensis =

San Clemente Island brodiaea

Species of flowering plant

Brodiaea kinkiensis is a species of Brodiaea also with the common name San Clemente Island brodiaea. This flower is endemic to San Clemente Island, one of the Channel Islands of California.

This flower is not considered endangered, but it is of some concern since its entire wild distribution is limited to the clay mesas of San Clemente Island.

== Description ==
It is a perennial herb. It has one cylindrical leaf alongside a tall stem which bears an inflorescence of one to several bell-shaped blooms. Each flower has six petallike tepals in shades of light purple with darker purple longitudinal stripes or streaks. The fruit is a capsule containing black seeds.
