= Brodiaea stellaris =

Conservation status
- Imperiled (NatureServe)

Scientific classification
- Kingdom: Plantae
- Clade: Tracheophytes
- Clade: Angiosperms
- Clade: Monocots
- Order: Asparagales
- Family: Asparagaceae
- Subfamily: Brodiaeoideae
- Genus: Brodiaea
- Species: B. stellaris

Binomial name
- Brodiaea stellaris S.Wats.

Species of flowering plant

Brodiaea stellaris is a species of flowering plant in the cluster-lily genus known by the common name starflower brodiaea.

The bulb is endemic to northern California, where it grows on the serpentine soils of the North California Coast Ranges. Flowering peaks in May

== Description ==
Brodiaea stellaris is a perennial that produces a short inflorescence only a few centimeters tall which bears flowers on pedicels. Each flower has six blue-purple tepals up to 1.5 centimeters long. At the center of the flower are large white sterile stamens called staminodes which surround the distinctive forked fertile stamens.
