= Brodiaea insignis =

Conservation status
- Critically Imperiled (NatureServe)

Scientific classification
- Kingdom: Plantae
- Clade: Tracheophytes
- Clade: Angiosperms
- Clade: Monocots
- Order: Asparagales
- Family: Asparagaceae
- Subfamily: Brodiaeoideae
- Genus: Brodiaea
- Species: B. insignis

Binomial name
- Brodiaea insignis (Jeps.) Niehaus

Species of flowering plant

Brodiaea insignis is a rare species of flowering plant in the cluster-lily genus known by the common name Kaweah brodiaea. It is endemic to the Sierra Nevada foothills of central Tulare County, California, where it grows along the Tule and Kaweah Rivers. It is considered endangered on the state level.

== Description ==
This perennial produces an inflorescence up to 25 centimeters tall which bears purple to pinkish flowers on long pedicels. Each flower has a narrow cylindrical tube which opens into a flat face of six tepals, each 1 to 1.5 centimeters long. In the center of the flower are three fertile stamens and three staminodes, which are flat, white sterile stamens, each with a two-pointed tip.
