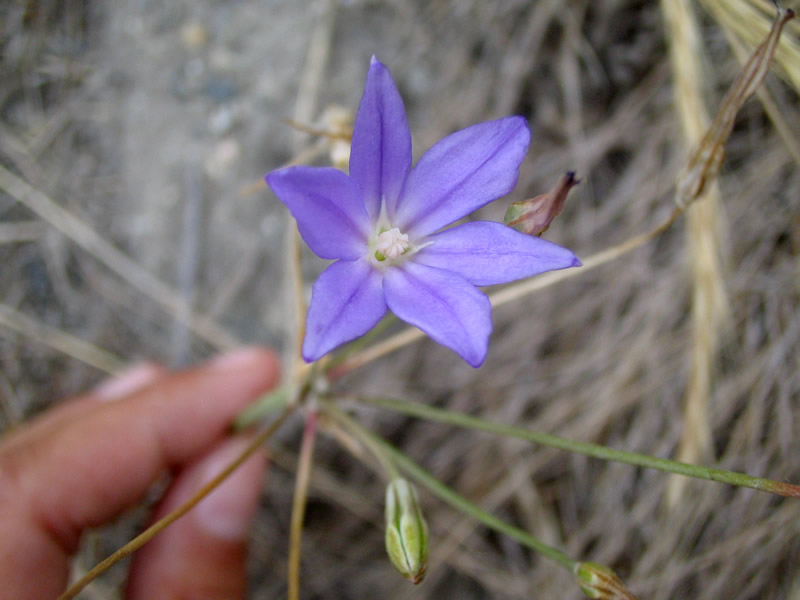

Conservation status
- Threatened (ESA)

Scientific classification
- Kingdom: Plantae
- Clade: Tracheophytes
- Clade: Angiosperms
- Clade: Monocots
- Order: Asparagales
- Family: Asparagaceae
- Subfamily: Brodiaeoideae
- Genus: Brodiaea
- Species: B. filifolia

Binomial name
- Brodiaea filifolia S.Wats.

Synonyms
- Hookera filifolia

= Brodiaea filifolia =

Species of flowering plant

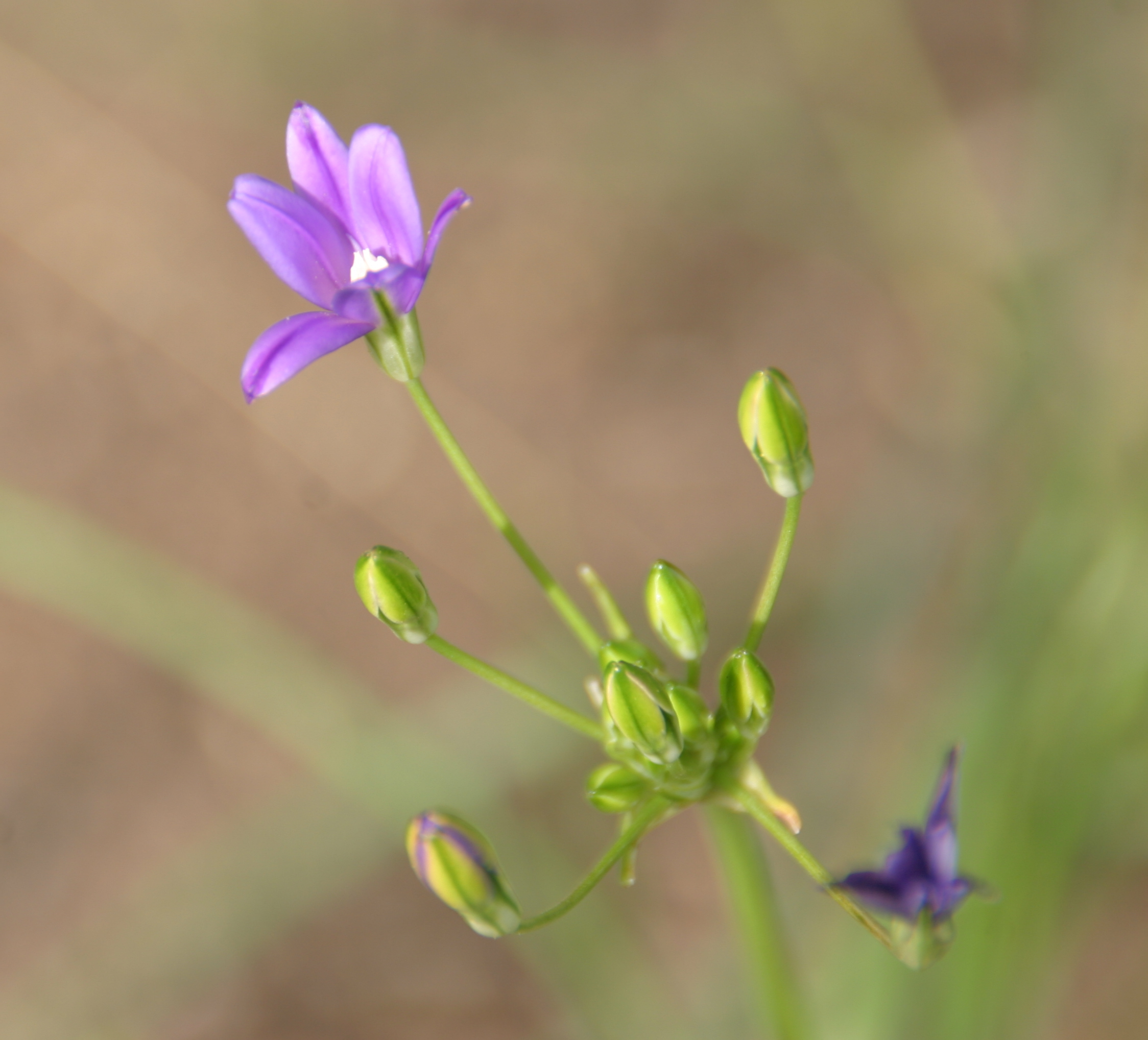
Brodiaea filifolia (thread-leaved brodiaea), San Gabriel Valley

Brodiaea filifolia, known by the common name thread-leaved brodiaea, is a rare species of flowering plant in the cluster-lily genus. It is endemic to southern California, mostly in the region around the junction of Orange, Riverside, and San Diego Counties.

The bulb is a resident of scattered remaining vernal pool and grassland habitats. It is a federally listed threatened species and it has been listed as an endangered species since 1982 on the state level.

== Description ==
Brodiaea filifolia is a perennial producing an inflorescence 20 to 30 centimeters tall which bears bright purple flowers. Each flower has six spreading tepals 1 to 1.5 centimeters long with a center containing three stamens and narrow or small staminodes, which are flat sterile stamens lying against the tepals.

The thread-leaved brodiaea exists as a dormant, water-retaining corm or bulb at the beginning of its life cycle. This period can last from late summer to mid-winter or until ideal conditions for growth are met. Blooming season ranges from spring to early summer.

== Etymology ==
The genus, Brodiaea, is the namesake of Scottish botanist, James Brodie.

The term filifolia is a descriptor for thin, thread-like leaves. It is derived from the Latin words ‘filum’ and ‘folium’ meaning ‘thread’ and ‘leaf’ respectively, hence the species distinction ‘thread-leaved’.

== Distribution and habitat ==
This plant occurs in grassland areas, often in floodplains, and it is a member of the local vernal pool flora. It thrives in an acidic – though almost neutral – pH range specifically between 6.1-6.4. These habitats and conditions are becoming increasingly rare as they are being cleared for development, especially as residential areas expand. Undeveloped land near residential areas is degraded by exotic vegetation, mowing and other fire suppression efforts, sewage dumping, grazing of livestock, off-road vehicle use, and other processes such as the displacement and redirection of water sources.

The plant is also at risk for reduced genetic variability. While the thread-leaved brodiaea is able to drop seeds like most other angiosperms, it primarily reproduces vegetatively by producing new corms, a method of cloning which does not produce individuals with new combinations of genes. Successful pollination by other organisms is also difficult to come across since the species responsible for effectively pollinating Brodiaea filifolia are limited to the tumbling flower beetle and the sweat bee. When the plant does reproduce sexually, it requires unrelated individuals which have different genes. It cannot fertilize itself, nor can it successfully reproduce with closely related individuals. Small population sizes that have low genetic diversity and wide distances between populations make it less likely the plant will successfully undergo sexual reproduction. The plant sometimes hybridizes with Brodiaea orcuttii.

Brodiaea filifolia is concentrated in select areas of Southern California. There are about 68 occurrences remaining in widely spaced locations between the San Gabriel Mountains and west-central San Diego County. Several occurrences have been discovered since the plant joined the endangered species list, including locations on Camp Pendleton, and a few have been extirpated.

== Conservation ==
In order to combat the increasing threat that urbanization has on the growth of Brodiaea filifolia, individual counties within its region of occurrence have taken action to protect the remaining population.

=== Los Angeles County ===
B. filifolia has been greatly affected by the copious amounts of urban modifications that occur in the Los Angeles area. However, a long-term protection effort has been upheld by the Glendora Community Conservancy. This has proven to be rather effective, as it has been observed that the number of occurrences increased from 2 to 7 between the years 2009 to 2023. Out of those, 4 are permanently conserved.

=== San Bernardino County ===
San Bernardino County had been less active in the effort to secure its sparse numbers of Brodiaea filifolia, until more recent years. Back in 2009, there was no recorded conservation status for any extant occurrences. Since then, there has been an observed increase of one occurrence and it is now known that one of three is being conserved by the San Bernardino National Forest.

=== Riverside County ===
As of 2023, all reported instances are protected under the Western Riverside County Multiple Species Habitat Conservation Plan (WRCMSHCP).

=== Orange County ===
The population of B. filifolia in Orange County has grown to twice its size in the past one and a half decades as a result of the multiple Habitat Conservation Plans (HCP) taking place within the County.

=== San Diego County ===
San Diego County is home to one of the most prominent conservation efforts in Southern California, that being the site of Marine Corps Base Camp Pendleton (MCBCP). The thread-leaved brodiaea grows in abundance in this area and military training procedures have even been modified to accommodate species growth and protection.

Besides Camp Pendleton, there are also many projects and plans in San Diego County that work towards limiting habitat loss. This creates greater opportunities for B. filifolia to grow to the extent it has in San Diego County compared to other regions of Southern California.
