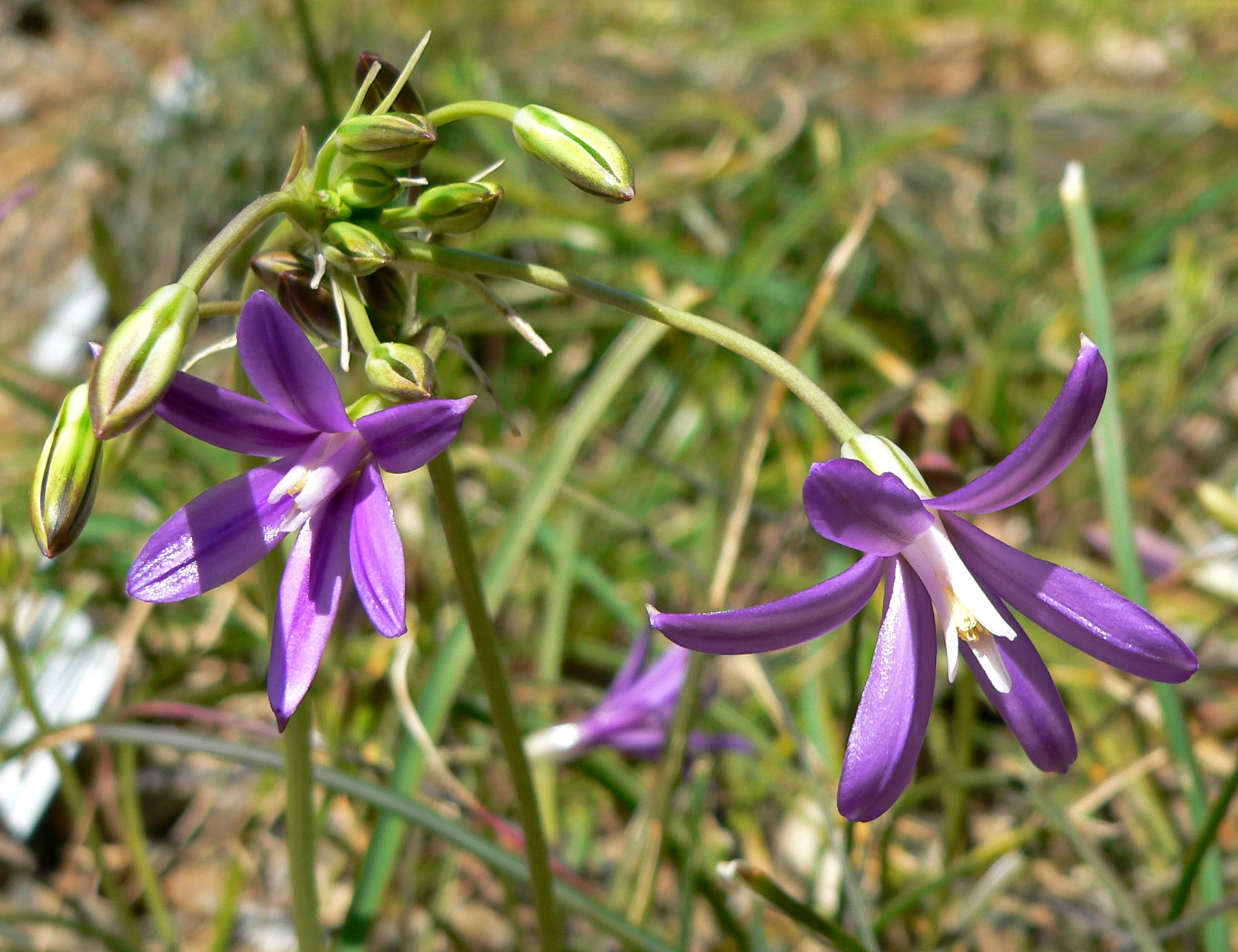
- Appendage brodiaea

Conservation status
- Vulnerable (NatureServe)

Scientific classification
- Kingdom: Plantae
- Clade: Embryophytes
- Clade: Tracheophytes
- Clade: Spermatophytes
- Clade: Angiosperms
- Clade: Monocots
- Order: Asparagales
- Family: Asparagaceae
- Subfamily: Brodiaeoideae
- Genus: Brodiaea
- Species: B. appendiculata

Binomial name
- Brodiaea appendiculata Hoover

= Brodiaea appendiculata =

Species of flowering plant

Brodiaea appendiculata, the appendage brodiaea or appendage cluster-lily, is an uncommon species of plant in the genus Brodiaea.

Brodiaea appendiculata is endemic to California, where it grows in the mountain foothills in the north part of the state.
