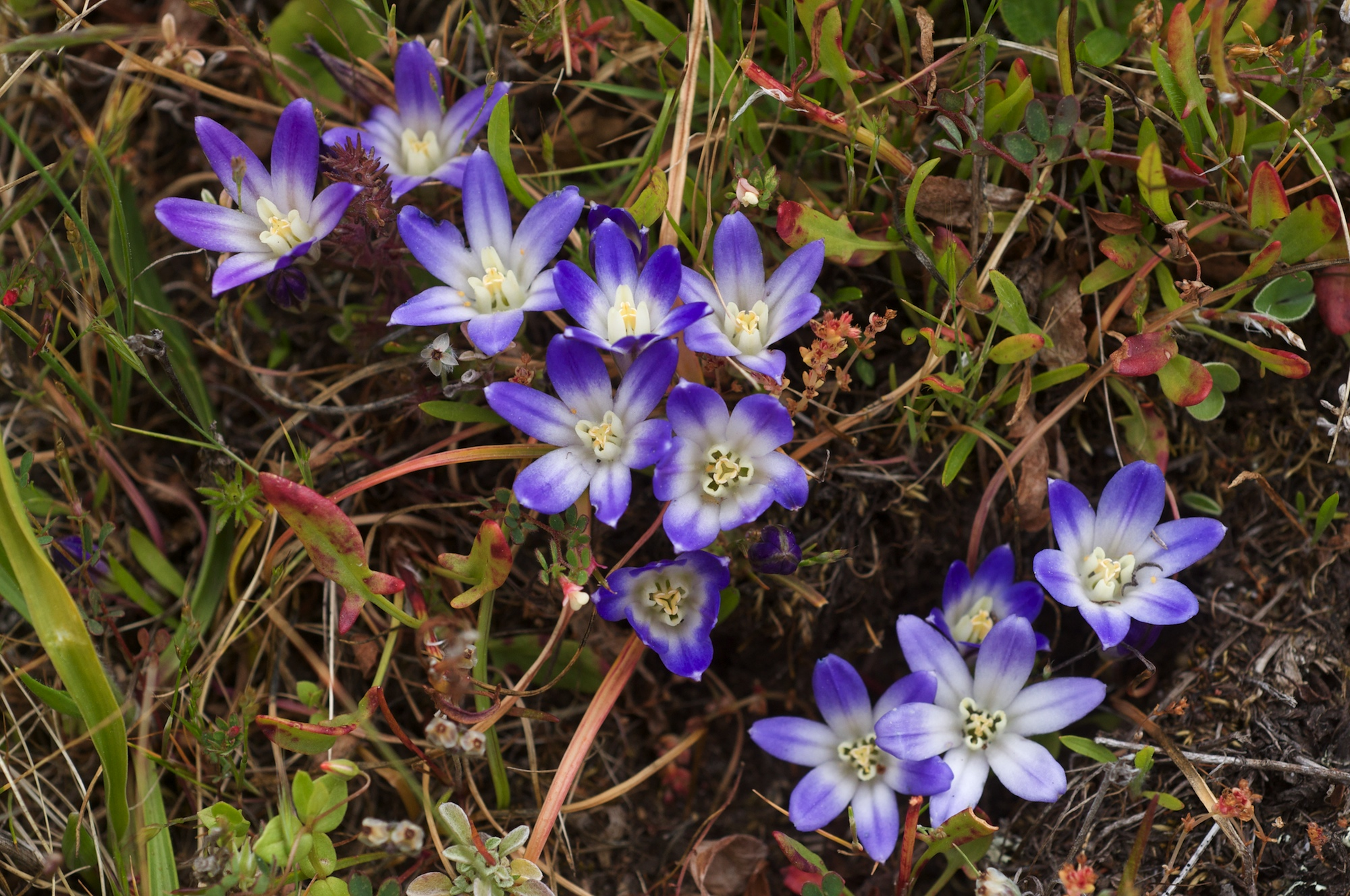
- Dwarf brodiaea

Scientific classification
- Kingdom: Plantae
- Clade: Tracheophytes
- Clade: Angiosperms
- Clade: Monocots
- Order: Asparagales
- Family: Asparagaceae
- Subfamily: Brodiaeoideae
- Genus: Brodiaea
- Species: B. terrestris

Binomial name
- Brodiaea terrestris Kellogg (1859)

Subspecies
- Brodiaea terrestris ssp. kernensis Brodiaea terrestris ssp. terrestris

Synonyms
- Hookera terrestris (Kellogg) Britten ex Greene; Sources: IPNI, ITIS

= Brodiaea terrestris =

Species of flowering plant

Brodiaea terrestris, the dwarf brodiaea, is a species of plant in the genus Brodiaea that is native to California, Oregon and Baja California.

In California, it is found in coastal ranges from the Oregon border, through the Bay Area, to San Diego and northern Baja California, and in the central Sierra Nevada.

There are two subspecies:

- Brodiaea terrestris ssp. kernensis (Kern brodiaea)
- Brodiaea terrestris ssp. terrestris (dwarf brodiaea).
