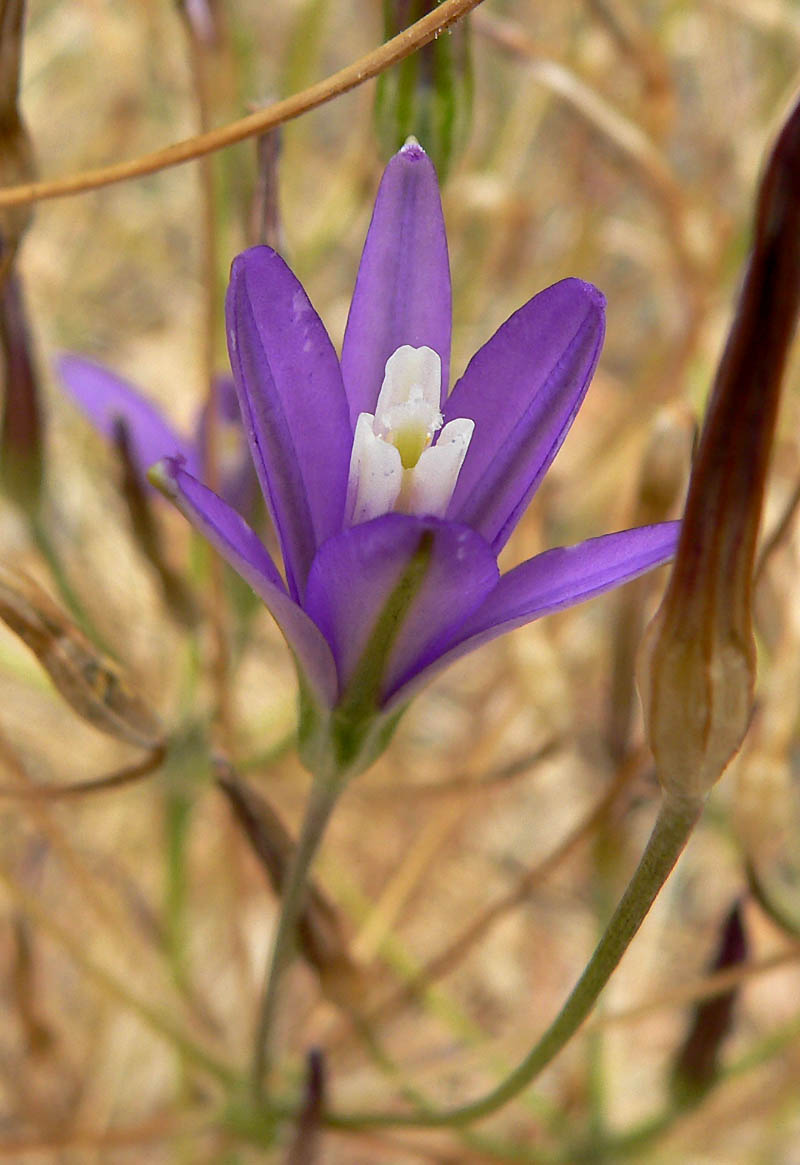

Scientific classification
- Kingdom: Plantae
- Clade: Tracheophytes
- Clade: Angiosperms
- Clade: Monocots
- Order: Asparagales
- Family: Asparagaceae
- Subfamily: Brodiaeoideae
- Genus: Brodiaea
- Species: B. californica

Binomial name
- Brodiaea californica Lindl. (1896)

Subspecies
- Brodiaea californica ssp. californica Brodiaea californica ssp. leptandra

Synonyms
- Hookera leptandra Greene; Sources: IPNI, NRCS, UniProt, GRIN

= Brodiaea californica =

Species of flowering plant

Brodiaea californica, with the common name California brodiaea, is a species of plant in the genus Brodiaea.

The perennial plant, growing from a bulb, is native to California and Oregon.

Brodiaea californica is the largest species in the genus Brodiaea, reaching up to 30 in (76 cm) in height when in flower. The flowers, which are borne in late spring or early summer, are variable in colour, ranging from purple to white or occasionally pink.

== Etymology ==
Brodiaea is named for James Brodie [1744-1824], a Scottish botanist who was known for his discovery of Pyrola uniflora in Britain.

Californica means 'from California'.
