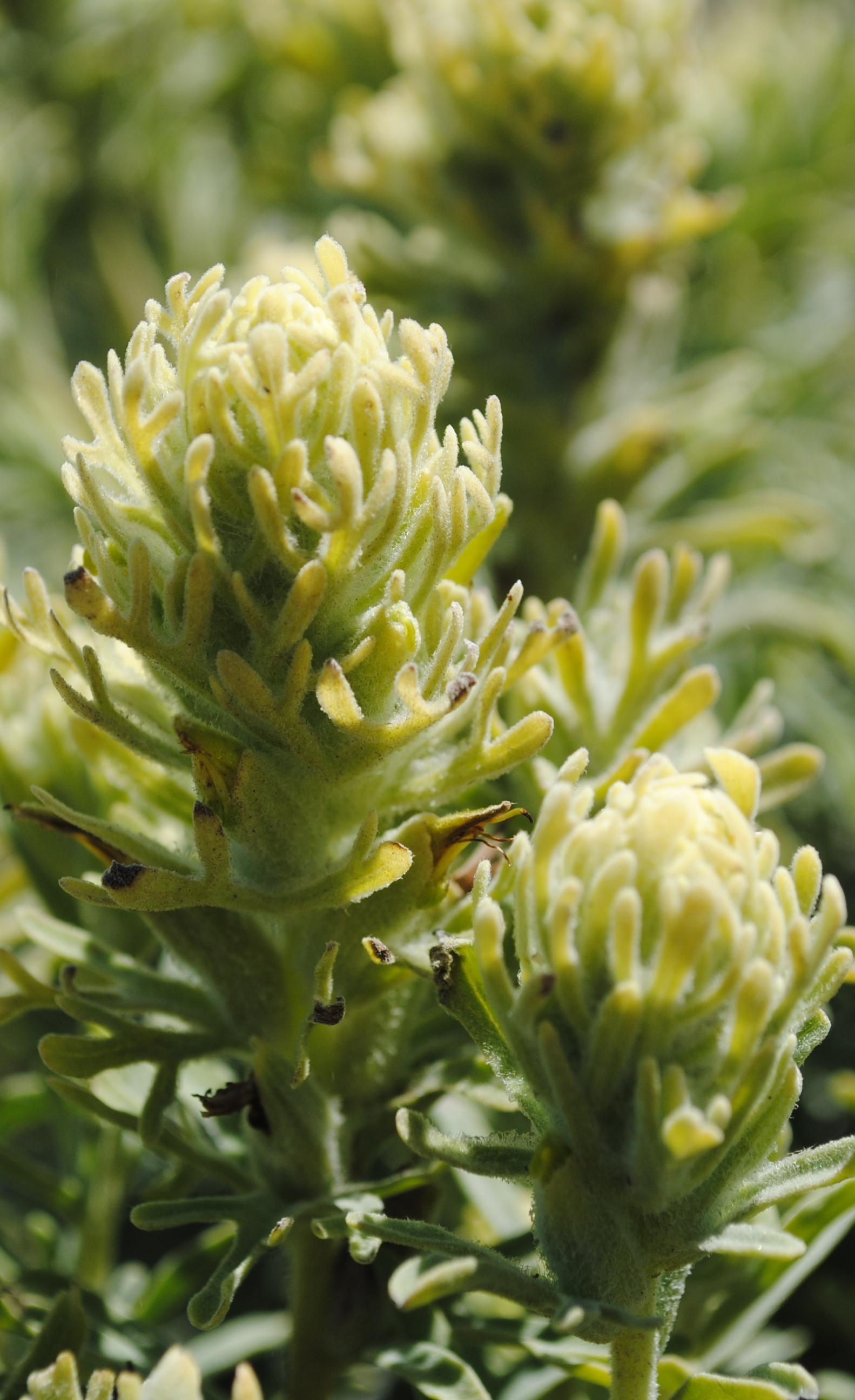

Conservation status
- Delisted (ESA)

- Vulnerable (NatureServe)

Scientific classification
- Kingdom: Plantae
- Clade: Tracheophytes
- Clade: Angiosperms
- Clade: Eudicots
- Clade: Asterids
- Order: Lamiales
- Family: Orobanchaceae
- Genus: Castilleja
- Species: C. grisea

Binomial name
- Castilleja grisea Dunkle

Synonyms
- Castilleja hololeuca subsp. grisea (Dunkle) Munz

= Castilleja grisea =

Species of flowering plant

Castilleja grisea is a rare species of Indian paintbrush known by the common name San Clemente Island Indian paintbrush. It is endemic to San Clemente Island, one of the Channel Islands of California. San Clemente Island is owned by the US Navy so the Navy is involved in a management program to recover this species.

== Description ==
The San Clemente Island Indian paintbrush is a perennial herb coated densely in long gray hairs. The highly branching stem grows 40 to 60 centimeters tall and bears linear leaves each a few centimeters long. The inflorescence is made up of layers of bracts one to two centimeters long, gray-green in color at the bases and tipped with greenish yellow. Between the bracts emerge dull yellow pouched flowers. The fruit is a capsule about a centimeter long containing tiny seeds with netted surfaces.

== Distribution ==
This species was once considered to be "relatively common" on its home island. Since then the habitat has been severely degraded, mainly by feral goats which were introduced there. The island was also used for grazing sheep and cattle, and some feral pigs were present. The animals may have eaten the plant at times, but they mainly damaged the land by trampling the soil, which led to soil compaction, loss of topsoil, and erosion. The introduction of exotic plant species such as ripgut brome (Bromus diandrus), wild oat (Avena barbata), and red brome (Bromus madritensis rubus) also degraded the habitat.

Due to steep terrain of San Clemente Island the exact abundance of Castilleja grisea is not currently known. Recent surveys have discovered new populations of this species. Surveys in 2007 estimate more than 10,000 plants existing. This plant has been a federally listed endangered species since 1977, when it was one of the first species to be designated so. The plant's population had been drastically reduced by the activity of the feral goats. Its populations has increased at least ten-fold since the removal of these non-native herbivores. The species has recovered so well through management programs by the Navy, it was recommended for downlisting during the last review conducted by the United States Fish and Wildlife Service. Remaining threats include erosion, invasive grasses, and wildfire from military exercises.

The species has a relatively high genetic variability for an uncommon island endemic. This and its steady recovery from low numbers give an optimistic outlook for the species' recovery.
