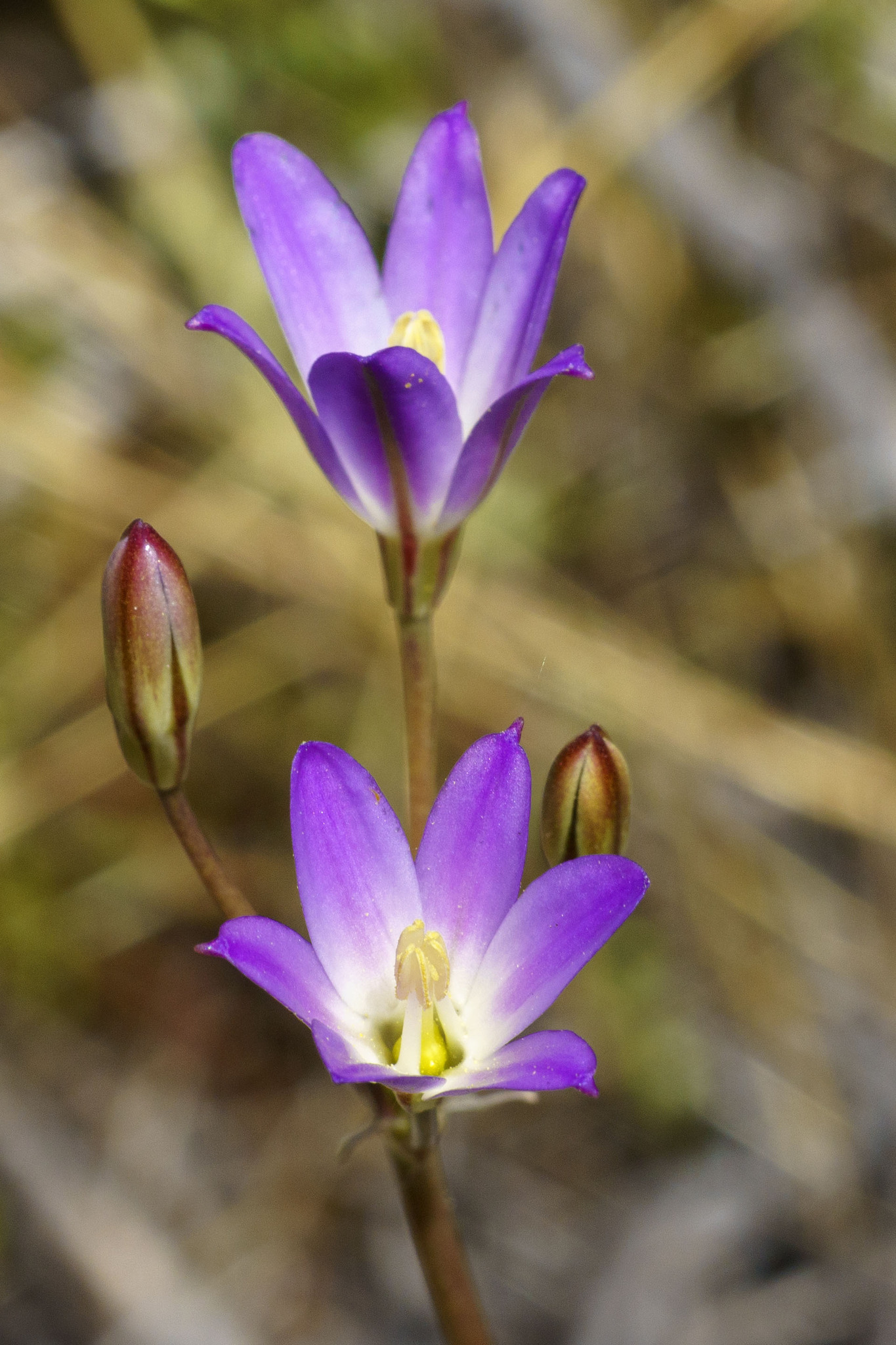

Conservation status
- Imperiled (NatureServe)

Scientific classification
- Kingdom: Plantae
- Clade: Tracheophytes
- Clade: Angiosperms
- Clade: Monocots
- Order: Asparagales
- Family: Asparagaceae
- Subfamily: Brodiaeoideae
- Genus: Brodiaea
- Species: B. orcuttii

Binomial name
- Brodiaea orcuttii (Greene) Baker

Synonyms
- Brodiaea filifolia var. orcuttii (Greene) Jeps. Hookera multipedunculata Abrams; Hookera orcuttii Greene

= Brodiaea orcuttii =

Orcutt's brodiaea

Species of plant

Brodiaea orcuttii is a species of flowering plant in the asparagus family, of the subfamily Brodiaeoideae. It is a cluster-lily known commonly as Orcutt's brodiaea. This corm-sprouting species is nearly endemic to San Diego County, with the periphery of its range reaching the southern portion of Riverside County along with some populations sparsely scattered in northwestern Baja California. Brodiaea orcuttii is usually associated with the marginal areas of vernal pools, seeps, meadows, and stream embankments, microhabitats which can generally be found from coastal mesas to interior mountains. The red-purple to blue flowers bloom from April to July. It can be distinguished from all other species of Brodiaea by its lack of staminodes.

== Description ==
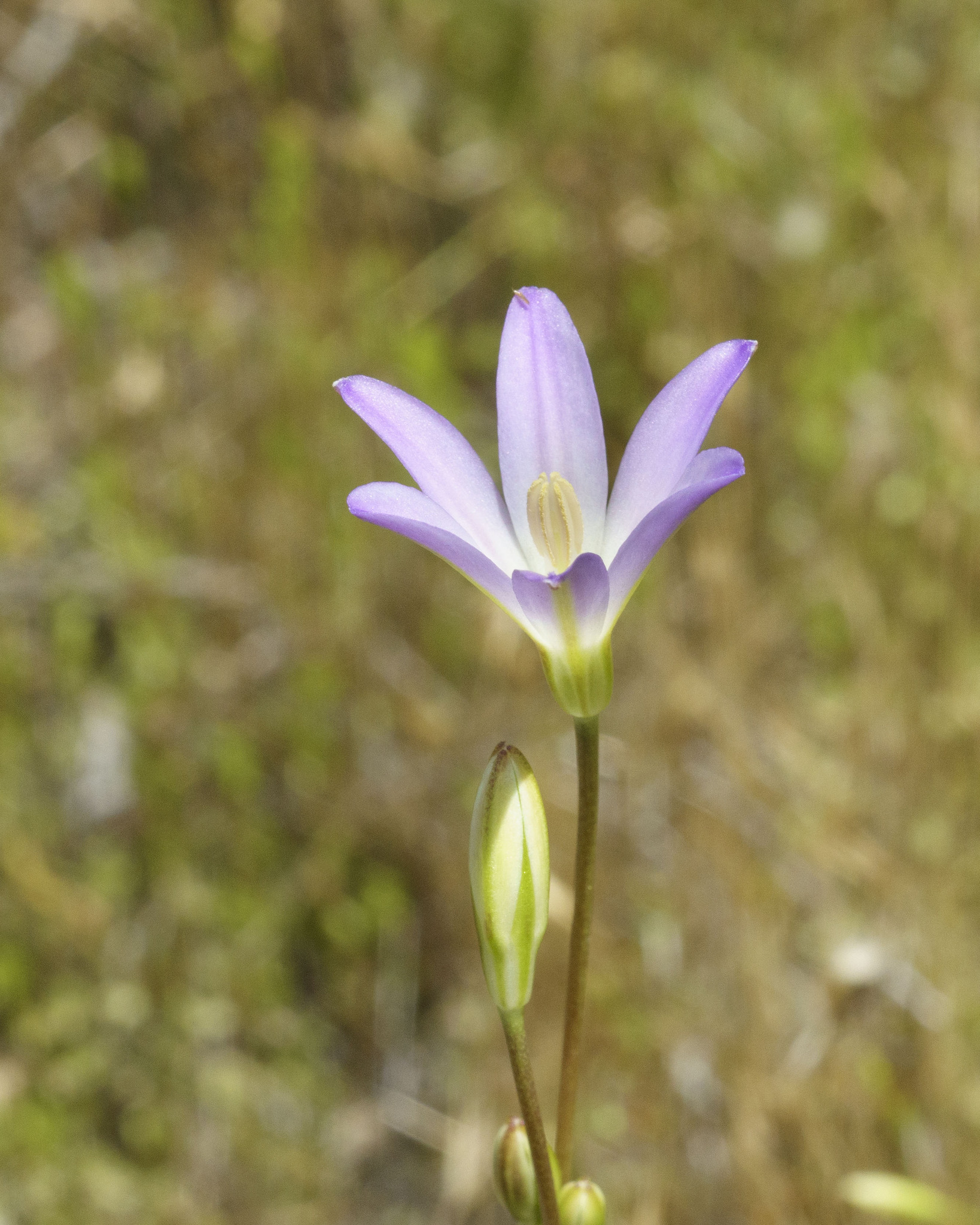
Brodiaea orcuttii is the only species in its genus to lack staminodes

Brodiaea orcuttii is a perennial geophyte, storing nutrients and water throughout the dormant season in its corm. The dormant season begins in early summer and ends in late fall, and the stored starch within the corm allows the leaves and roots to rapidly develop once dormancy is broken with the first significant fall rains. There are about 1-6 linear leaves that emerge from the corm during the growing period. The leaves are withered by the time the plant is in flower. Mature plants also produce cormlets during the winter growing season.

Flowering occurs from April to July, producing a slender scape 8–25 cm (3.1–9.8 in) tall. The flowers are attached to the inflorescence on pedicels ≤6 cm (2.4 in) long. The flowers have a violet perianth measuring 17–32 mm (0.67–1.26 in) large, with a funnelform tube 4–10 mm (0.16–0.39 in) long. The perianth lobes are spreading, with the inner lobes 3–5 mm (0.12–0.20 in) wide and the outer lobes 5–7 mm (0.20–0.28 in) wide. The lobes measure 12–19 mm (0.47–0.75 in) long.

Brodiaea orcuttii is conspicuous among the genus as it is the only species to lack staminodes. The stamen consists of filaments 4–8 mm (0.16–0.31 in) long topped by anthers 4–6.5 mm (0.16–0.26 in) long. The anthers are linear in shape and have a v-shaped notch at their tip. The gynoecium consists of an ovary 3–7 mm (0.12–0.28 in) long with a style up to 15 mm (0.59 in) in length.

== Taxonomy ==
Brodiaea orcuttii was first described as Hookera orcuttii by Edward Lee Greene in 1886, based on specimens by Charles Russell Orcutt, the namesake of the species, collected in the vicinity of San Diego in 1884.
