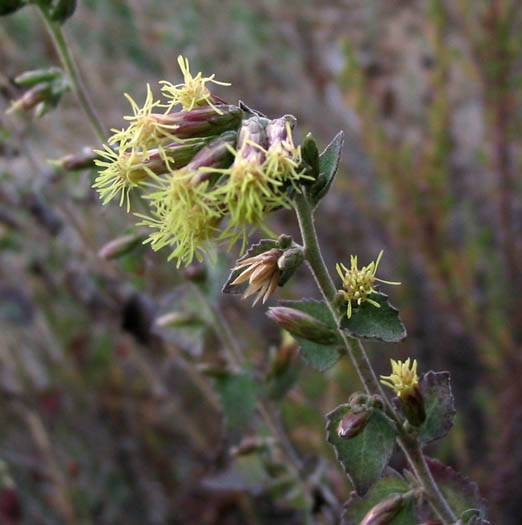

Conservation status
- Secure (NatureServe)

Scientific classification
- Kingdom: Plantae
- Clade: Tracheophytes
- Clade: Angiosperms
- Clade: Eudicots
- Clade: Asterids
- Order: Asterales
- Family: Asteraceae
- Genus: Brickellia
- Species: B. californica

Binomial name
- Brickellia californica (Torr. & A.Gray)

Synonyms
- Synonymy: Brickellia albicaulis (Rydb.) A.Nelson; Brickellia reniformis A.Gray; Brickellia tenera A.Gray; Brickellia wrightii A.Gray; Brickellia wrightii Durand & Hilg.; Bulbostylis californica Torr. & A.Gray; Coleosanthus albicaulis Rydb.; Coleosanthus axillaris Greene; Coleosanthus californicus (Torr. & A.Gray) Kuntze; Coleosanthus melissaefolius Greene; Coleosanthus melissifolius Greene; Coleosanthus reniformis (A.Gray) Rydb.; Coleosanthus tener (A.Gray) Kuntze; Coleosanthus wrightii (A.Gray) Britton; Eupatorium axillare (Torr. & A.Gray) Moc. & Sessé ex DC.

= Brickellia californica =

Species of flowering plant

Brickellia californica, known by the common name California brickellbush, is a species of flowering plant in the family Asteraceae.

== Distribution and habitat ==
The plant is native to Northern Mexico in Baja California, Sonora, Chihuahua, and Coahuila states; and much of the Western United States, across California north to Oregon, northeast to Idaho and Wyoming, and east through the Southwestern states to Colorado, New Mexico, and West Texas.

It is found below 2,700 metres (8,900 ft), in many habitat types including forests, woodlands, scrub, grasslands, and deserts.

It is a common plant in many types of California habitats, including chaparral, coastal sage scrub, oak woodland, valley grassland, yellow pine forest, Sierra Nevada subalpine zone, and Mojave Desert sky islands.

== Description ==
Brickellia californica is a thickly branching shrub growing 5–200 cm (2–78.5 in) in height. The fuzzy, glandular leaves are roughly triangular in shape with toothed to serrated edges. The leaves are 1 - 6 centimeters long.

The inflorescences at the end of stem branches contain many small leaves and bunches of narrow, cylindrical flower heads. Each head is about 13 millimeters long and wrapped in flat, wide, purplish green overlapping phyllaries. At the tip of the head are a number of long white to pink disc florets. The bloom period is August through November.

The fruit is a hairy cylindrical achene 3 millimeters long with a pappus of bristles.

=== Medicinal plant ===
The Navajo and Kumeyaay (Diegueño) peoples used it as a traditional medicinal plant for fevers, coughs, and prenatal complications.
