= San Clemente Island =

Island of the Channel Islands in California, United States

Native name: Kinkipar (Tongva) Isla de San Clemente (Spanish)
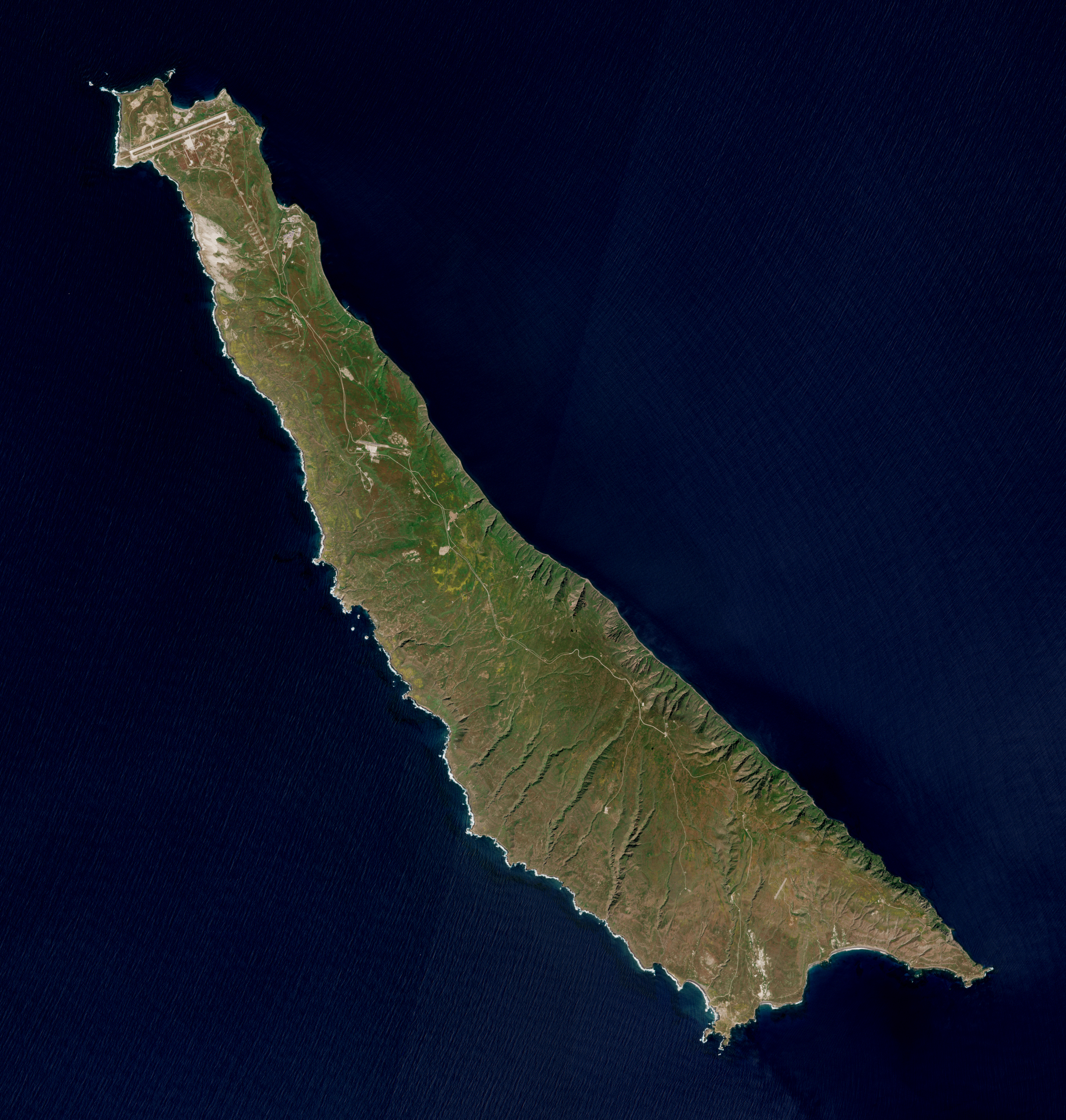
- Interactive map of San Clemente Island

Geography
- Location: Pacific Ocean
- Coordinates: 32°54′N 118°30′W
- Archipelago: Channel Islands (California)

Administration
- United States
- State: California
- County: Los Angeles

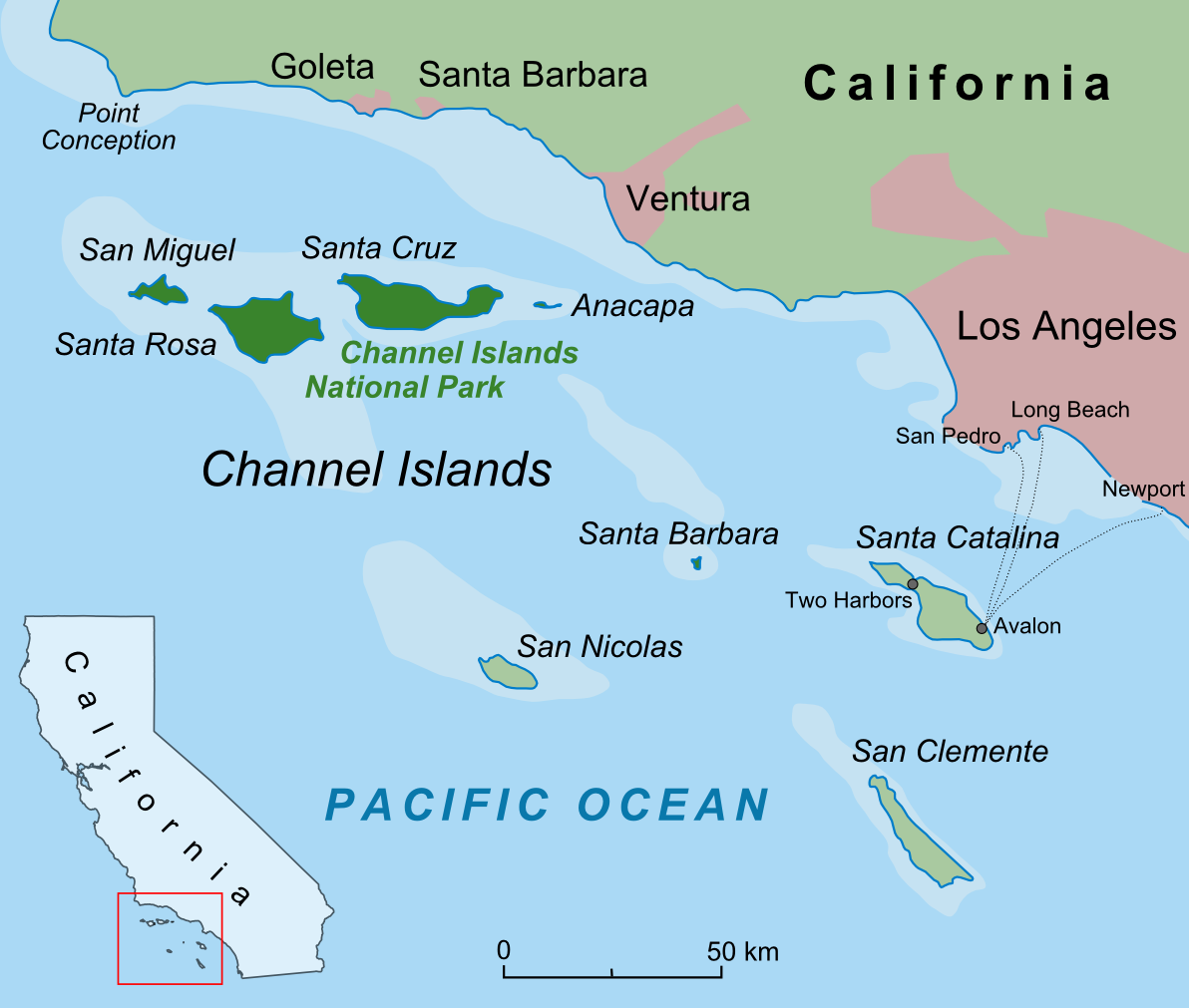
Map of Channel Islands

San Clemente Island (Tongva: Kinkipar; Spanish: Isla de San Clemente) is the southernmost of the Channel Islands of California. It is owned and operated by the United States Navy, and is a part of Los Angeles County. It is administered by Naval Base Coronado. It is 21 miles (34 km) long and has 147.13 km^{2} (56.81 sq mi) of land. The 2018 census estimates 148 military and civilian personnel reside on the island. The city of San Clemente in Orange County, California, is named after the island.

== Geography ==
=== Topography ===
Geologically, the island is described as being "the upper part of a tilted and gently arched northwestward-trending block of the earth's crust that has a straight, steep northeastern slope and a more irregular and much gentler southwestern slope" that is composed primarily of volcanic rock, with the northeast boundary of the island having a large fault that parallels most of the major faults on the California mainland. San Clemente Island has some of the best examples of marine terraces and has trench-like canyons, streams, periodic waterfalls, and pools of fresh water.

Its highest point is Mount Thirst, at 1,965 feet (599 m) in elevation. The elevation of the island's ridge can impact precipitation, as it can cause atmospheric moisture to condense and cause more intense precipitation. This was a factor in the intense rainstorm that hit San Diego on January 22, 2024.

=== Climate ===
This region experiences warm and dry summers and moderate mild falls and winters with no average monthly temperature above 21 °C (69.5 °F). According to the Köppen Climate Classification system, San Clemente Island has a warm-summer Mediterranean climate, abbreviated "Csb" on climate maps.

Climate data for San Clemente Island, CA (normals and extremes 1963-1989)
Month	Jan	Feb	Mar	Apr	May	Jun	Jul	Aug	Sep	Oct	Nov	Dec	Year
Record high °F (°C)	84.0 (28.9)	80.1 (26.7)	87.1 (30.6)	88.0 (31.1)	93.9 (34.4)	100.9 (38.3)	86.0 (30.0)	84.9 (29.4)	102.0 (38.9)	93.9 (34.4)	90.0 (32.2)	79.0 (26.1)	102.0 (38.9)
Mean daily maximum °F (°C)	65 (18)	64 (18)	65 (18)	68 (20)	69 (21)	71 (22)	74 (23)	75 (24)	75 (24)	73 (23)	68 (20)	65 (18)	69 (21)
Mean daily minimum °F (°C)	49 (9)	50 (10)	52 (11)	54 (12)	57 (14)	60 (16)	62 (17)	64 (18)	63 (17)	59 (15)	53 (12)	49 (9)	56 (13)
Record low °F (°C)	36.0 (2.2)	39.9 (4.4)	39.0 (3.9)	42.1 (5.6)	44.1 (6.7)	52.0 (11.1)	52.0 (11.1)	55.0 (12.8)	52.0 (11.1)	44.1 (6.7)	41.0 (5.0)	37.9 (3.3)	36.0 (2.2)
Average precipitation days (≥ 1.0 mm (0.039 inches))	4.7	3.8	4.3	2.4	0.6	0.1	0.2	0.2	0.8	0.9	3.2	3.6	24.8
Average relative humidity (%) (at 10 PT)	71.4	74.1	73	68.9	71.9	74.1	75.9	74.9	74.5	71.9	71.4	72.7	72.9
Average dew point °F (°C)	47.7 (8.7)	49.3 (9.6)	49.5 (9.7)	49.5 (9.7)	51.8 (11.0)	55.0 (12.8)	57.9 (14.4)	59.5 (15.3)	58.8 (14.9)	56.1 (13.4)	52.3 (11.3)	49.3 (9.6)	53.1 (11.7)
Source 1: NOAA (all data except mean daily max/min)
Source 2: Weather.com: "Monthly weather". San Clemente Island, CA. 2016.

== Ecology ==
=== Fauna and flora ===
The San Clemente Island loggerhead shrike is an endangered species that the Navy is taking steps to protect. The San Clemente Island fox is an indigenous species. Feral goats roamed the island for centuries, reaching a population of 11,000 in 1972, when their effect on indigenous species was realized. By 1980, the population had been reduced to 4,000. The Fund for Animals blocked a plan for shooting the remaining goats in court, so the goats were removed with nets and helicopters. The San Clemente Island goat is a recognized breed of domestic goat.

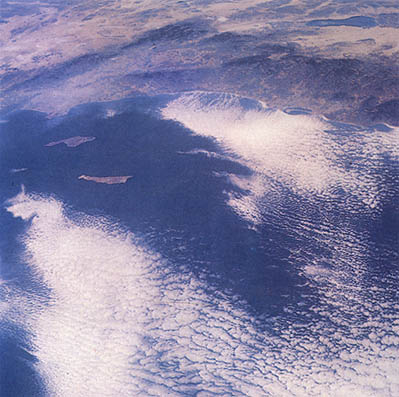
View from space of Southern California coast, showing Santa Catalina Island (closer to mainland) and San Clemente Island (farther from mainland).

The coves around the island are visited by snorkelers attracted by the abundant marine life, including sea lions, spiny lobsters, hydrocoral and kelp forests. The island is also home to the endangered San Clemente Island Bell's sparrow. After decades with no breeding by raptors, because of DDT contamination and Naval activity, there is now at least one breeding pair of bald eagles and more than one pair of peregrine falcons.

Island flora includes 300 native taxa and approximately 135 non-native taxa with distribution of at least 47 of the island’s native taxa being restricted to two or more of the California Islands, 15 plant taxa being only found on San Clemente Island, and one insular endemic of the island thought to be extinct. The flora of the island includes some plant species found nowhere else in the world. These endemic species include the wildflowers San Clemente Island brodiaea, San Clemente Island triteleia, San Clemente Island woodland star, and San Clemente Island Indian paintbrush, and the shrubs San Clemente Island bushmallow and Blair's wirelettuce. A unique subspecies of toyon, ssp. macrocarpa, also grows here, as do two rare subspecies of the royal larkspur.

Earthworms appear to have been introduced in 2008 in soil from the mainland used in a road construction project. In this earthworm-free region, the worms alter the soil and microbial communities, which allows non-native plants to change the island’s unique ecosystem and threaten biodiversity that exists there.

== History ==
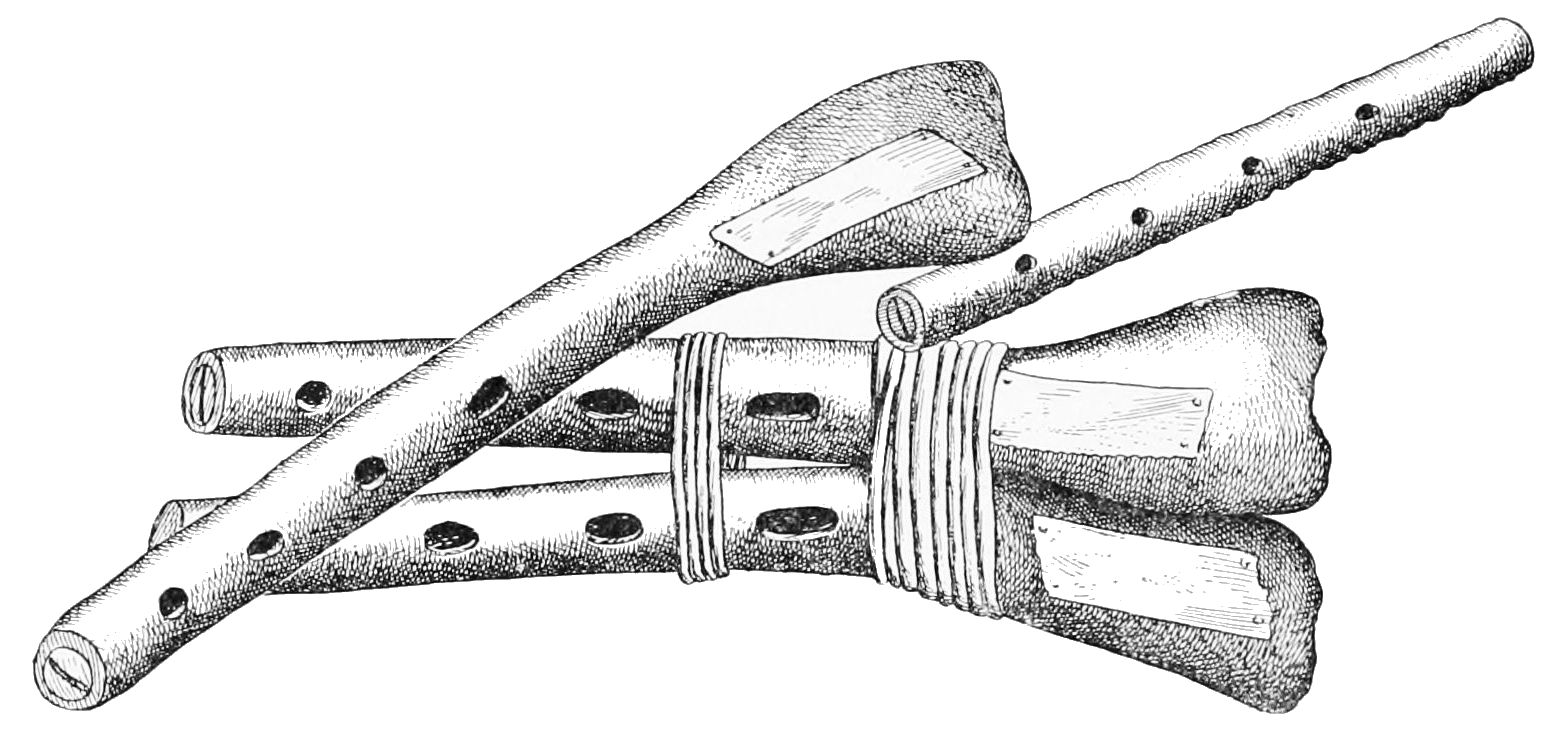
Illustration by C. F. Holder of Native American bone flutes found on San Clemente Island

Archaeologists have found traces of human occupation on San Clemente Island dating back 10,000 years.

Later, inhabitants left trade materials from the northern islands and the mainland, including Coso obsidian from the California desert. It has not been established what tribe the recent inhabitants belonged to, although the Tongva, who are well attested from Santa Catalina Island, are the most likely candidates. The Chumash, who occupied the northern Channel Islands, may have influenced the inhabitants. Evidence of battles: 'the skeletons of dozens of men piled, one upon another' were also noted on San Clemente and San Nicolas.

The first European to sight the island was Juan Rodríguez Cabrillo in 1542, who named it Victoria. It was renamed by Spanish explorer Sebastián Vizcaíno, who spotted it on November 23, 1602, Saint Clement's feast day. It was used by ranchers, fishermen, and smugglers during the 19th century and into the 20th century.

In 1835, the whaleship Elbe of Poughkeepsie, New York, under Captain Josiah B. Whippey (or Whipple), hunted sperm whales as far north as "St. Clements Island" (San Clemente Island). The American steamship Lansing, as well as the steam-schooner California, both anchored in Pyramid Cove, on the south side of San Clemente Island, to process blue, fin and humpback whales caught by their "killer boats" (steam-driven whale catchers)—the former between 1926 and 1930, and the latter between 1933 and 1937. In 1935, the Norwegian factory ship Esperanza caught blue whales as far north as San Clemente Island.

== Navy base ==
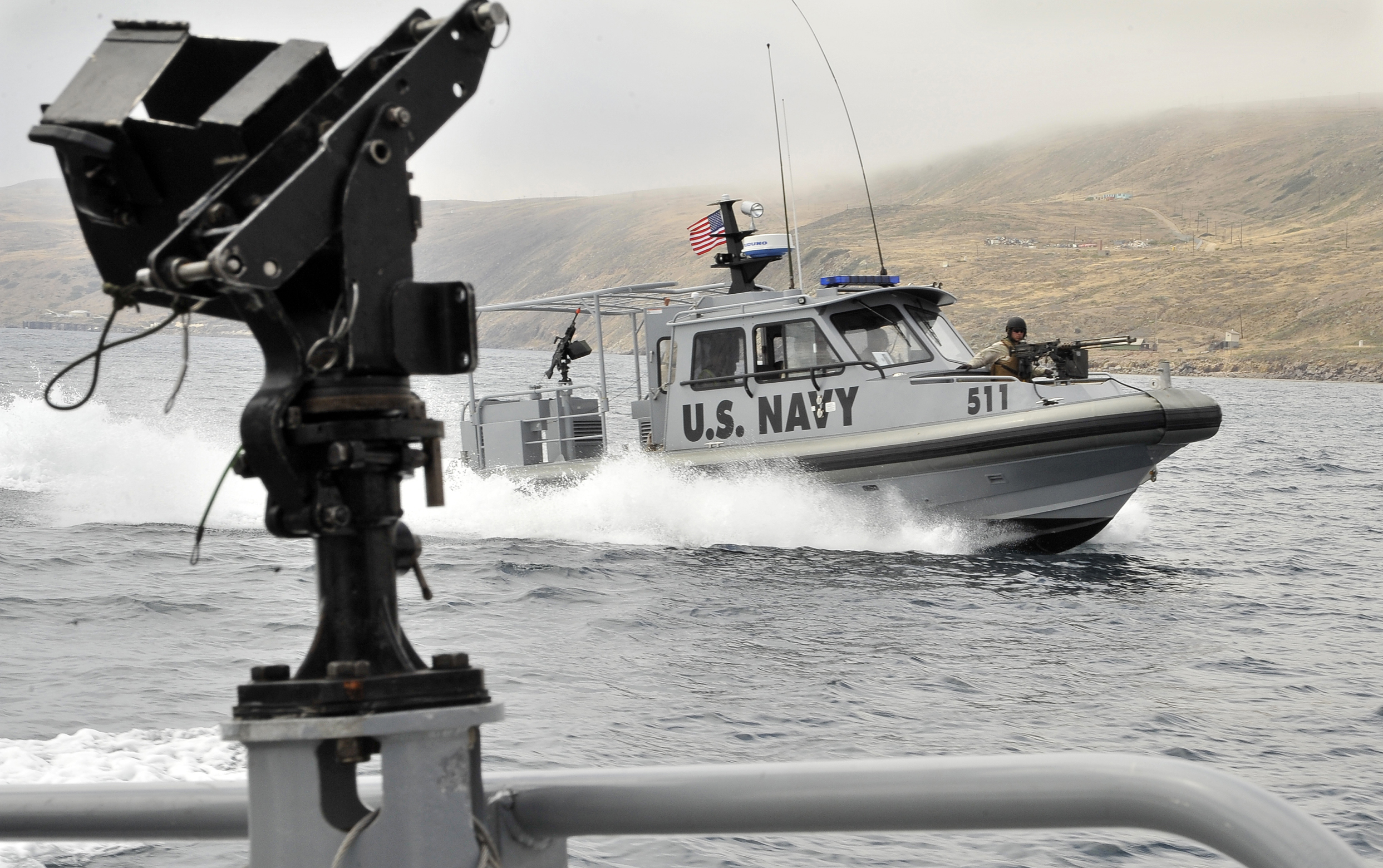
SAN CLEMENTE ISLAND, Calif. (July 19, 2011) Maritime Expeditionary Security Squadron (MSRON) 11 conduct patrol boat maneuvers on a 34-foot Sea Ark Dauntless tactical craft off San Clemente Island. (U.S. Navy photo by Mass Communication Specialist 2nd Class Noel L. Danseco/Released)

The US Navy acquired the island in 1934. It is the Navy's only remaining ship-to-shore live firing range, and is the center of the integrated air/land/sea San Clemente Island Range Complex covering 2,620 nm^{2} (8,990 km^{2}).

During World War II, the island was a training ground for amphibious landing craft. These small to mid-sized vessels were crucial to the island hopping that was required to attack the islands occupied by the Japanese.

It is an active sonar base and has a $21 million simulated city for commando training.

There is a US Navy rocket-test facility on the island. Some Polaris-program test rockets were launched from San Clemente Island between 1957 and 1960. The SEALAB III project took place off San Clemente Island in February 1969.

The US Navy uses the island as an auxiliary naval airfield, Naval Auxiliary Landing Field San Clemente Island. The main runway 24/06 is used for carrier training by the Navy. Other branches also use this airfield, including the United States Coast Guard.

As of 2014, San Clemente Island is home to an auxiliary Air Force base responsible for locating Air Force fighter pilots near the California coast.

The island has United States Navy SEALs training facilities.

Seven marines and one Navy sailor were presumed to have died when their amphibious assault vehicle (AAV) sank during a training exercise off the island's northwest coast on July 30, 2020. One of eight marines died after being rescued from the vehicle. Names of all nine people killed were identified on August 3. Fifteen Marines and a sailor were on the AAV as it returned to USS Somerset.

The USMC released a statement on 3 August 2020, saying the AAV had been found. The landing craft sank in nearly 400 feet of water.

On 27 August 2020, two soldiers were killed and three were injured when their Black Hawk helicopter crashed on San Clemente Island.

== Government and infrastructure ==
The island is owned and operated by the United States Navy, and is a part of Los Angeles County. It is administered by Naval Base Coronado. The Los Angeles County Sheriff's Department (LASD) operates the Avalon Station in Avalon, Santa Catalina Island, serving San Clemente Island. As of 2024, Robert Garcia, (District 42) represents the island's inhabitants in the United States House of Representatives, Lena Gonzalez in the California State Senate (District 33), and Josh Lowenthal in the California State Assembly (District 69).

== Gallery ==
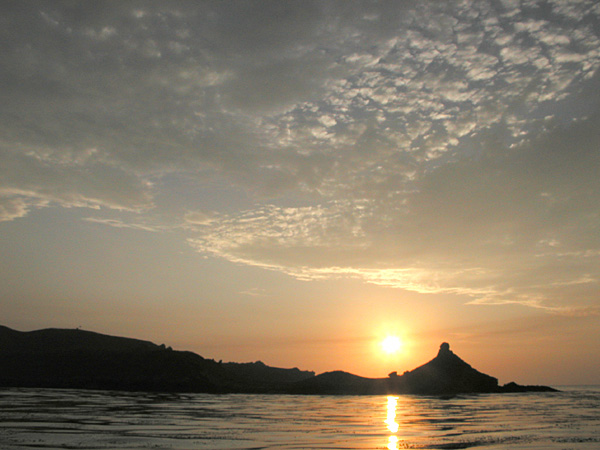
Sunrise at Pyramid Point, San Clemente Island

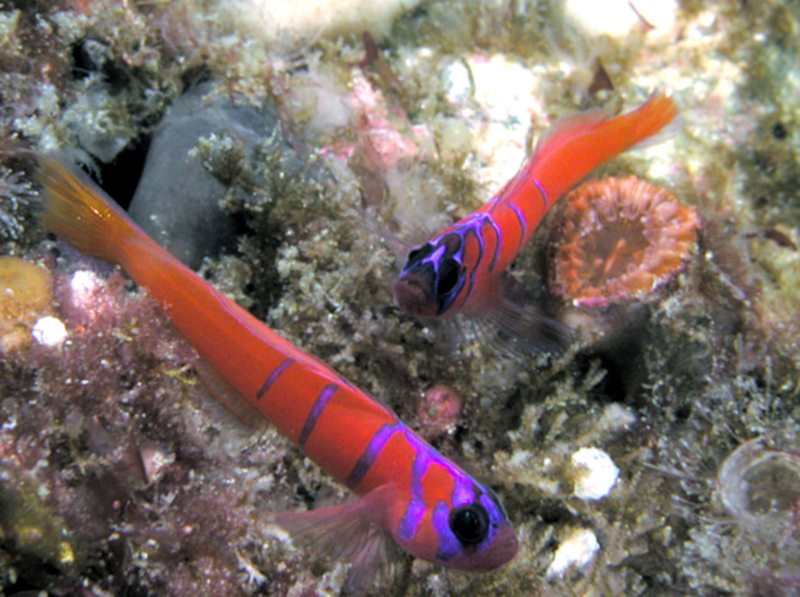
Bluebanded gobies, San Clemente Island

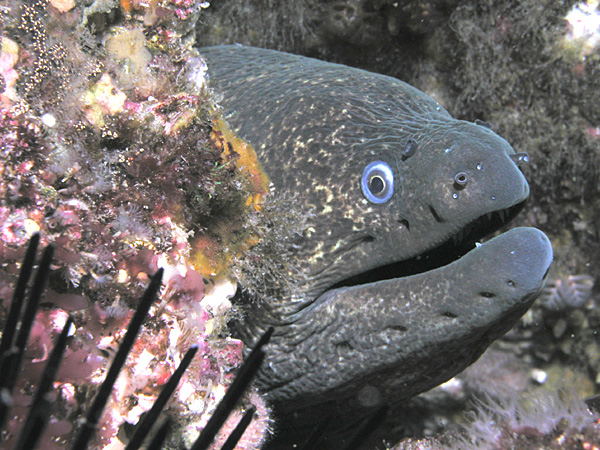
California moray eel, San Clemente Island

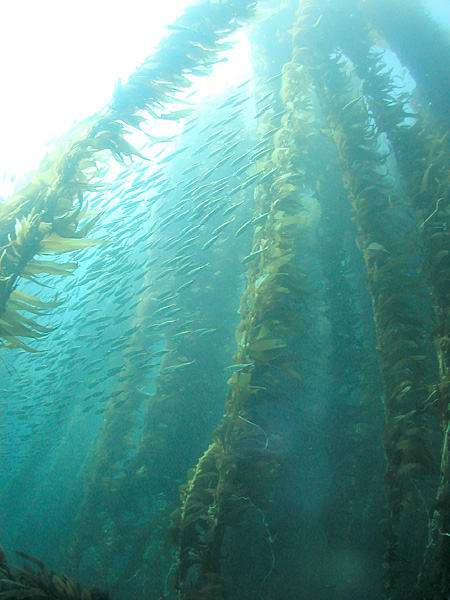
Kelp forest and sardines

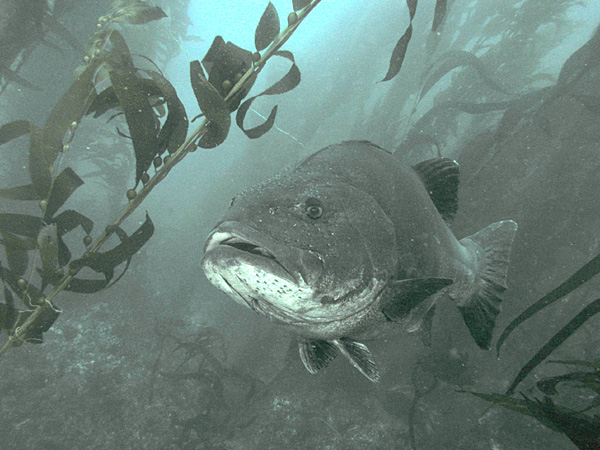
Giant black sea bass, San Clemente Island

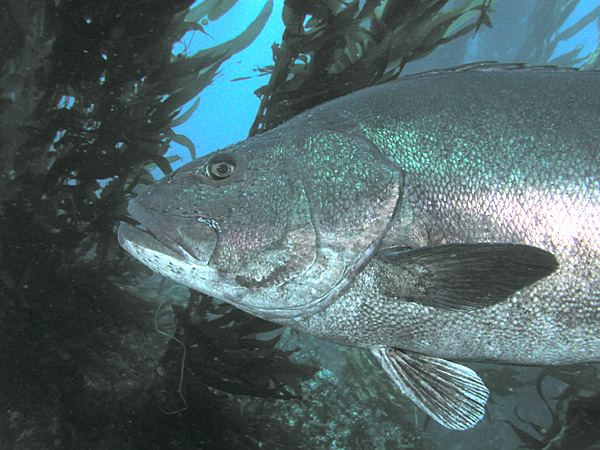
Giant black sea bass, San Clemente Island

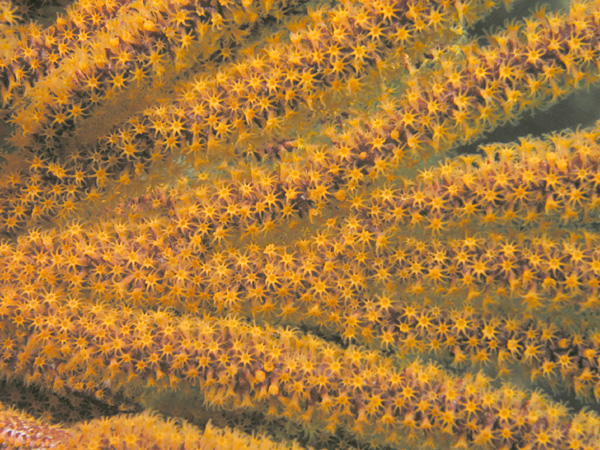
Sea fan, San Clemente Island

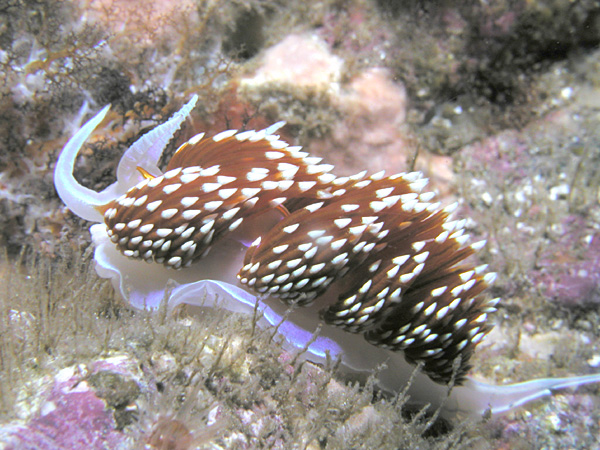
Hermissenda nudibranch, San Clemente Island

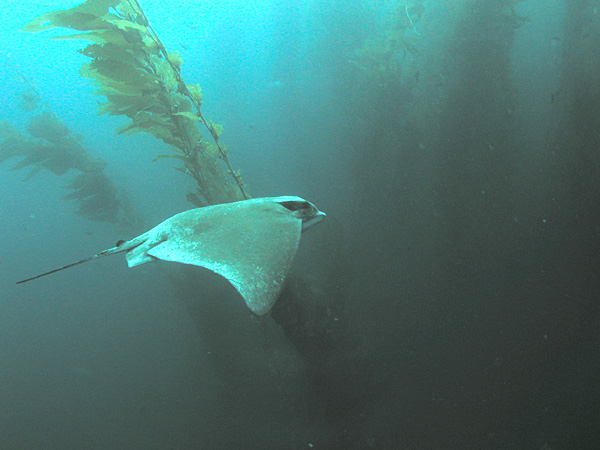
Bat ray in kelp forest, San Clemente Island

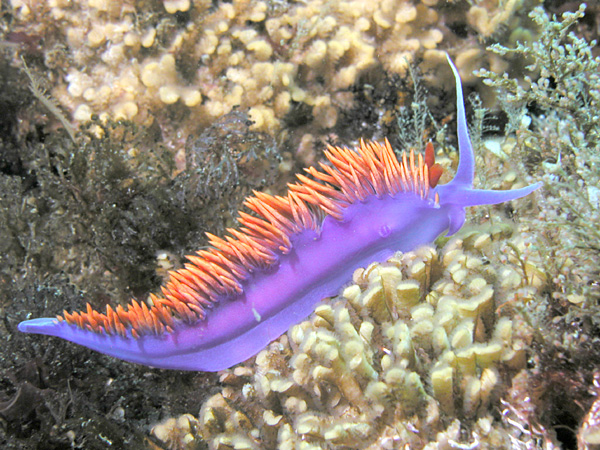
Spanish shawl nudibranch

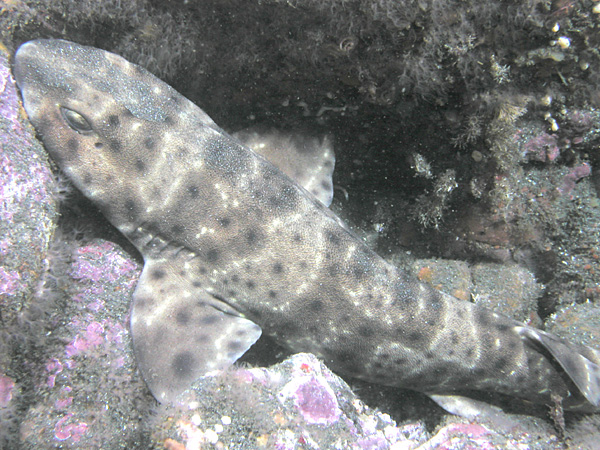
Swellshark, San Clemente Island

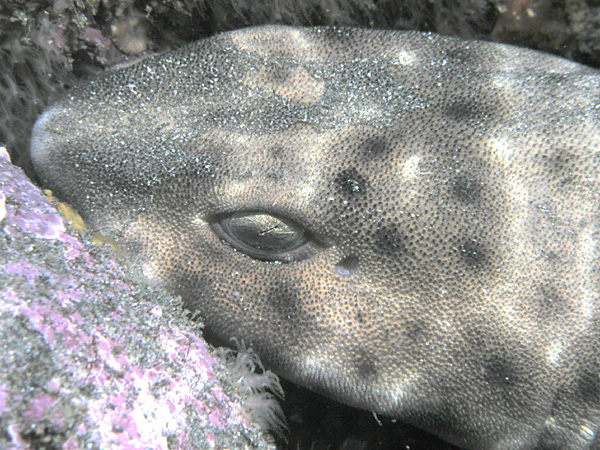
Swellshark closeup
