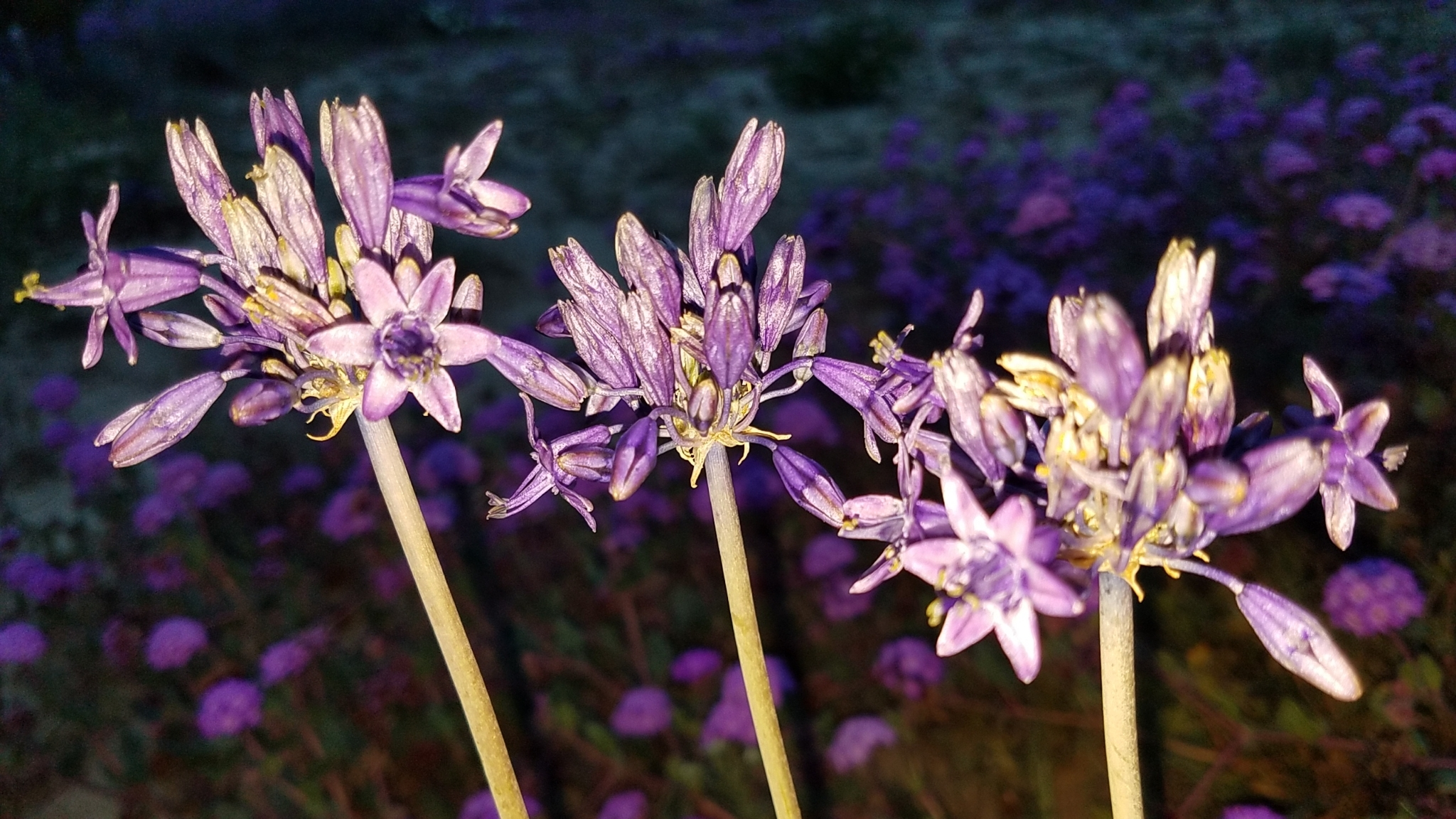

Scientific classification
- Kingdom: Plantae
- Clade: Tracheophytes
- Clade: Angiosperms
- Clade: Monocots
- Order: Asparagales
- Family: Asparagaceae
- Subfamily: Brodiaeoideae
- Genus: Triteleiopsis; Hoover
- Species: T. palmeri

Binomial name
- Triteleiopsis palmeri (S.Watson) Hoover

Synonyms
- Brodiaea palmeri (S.Watson); Triteleia palmeri (S.Watson) Greene

= Triteleiopsis =

Genus of flowering plants

Triteleiopsis, common name Bajalily or blue sand lily, is a genus of one known species of flowering plant found in Sonora, Baja California and southwestern Arizona. In the APG III classification system, it is placed in the family Asparagaceae, subfamily Brodiaeoideae (formerly the family Themidaceae).

The only known species is the bulbous plant Triteleiopsis palmeri, with the common name Palmer's Bajalily.
