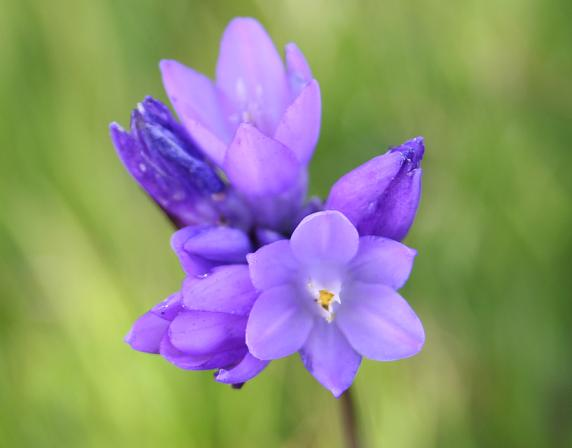
- Dichelostemma capitatum

Scientific classification
- Kingdom: Plantae
- Clade: Tracheophytes
- Clade: Angiosperms
- Clade: Monocots
- Order: Asparagales
- Family: Asparagaceae
- Subfamily: Brodiaeoideae

Genera
- 12 genera (see text)
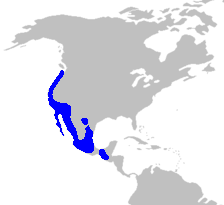
- Distribution

= Brodiaeoideae =

Subfamily of flowering plants

Brodiaeoideae are a monocot subfamily of flowering plants in the family Asparagaceae, order Asparagales. They have been treated as a separate family, Themidaceae. They are native to Central America and western North America, from British Columbia to Guatemala. The name of the subfamily is based on the type genus Brodiaea.

In molecular phylogenetic analyses, Brodiaeoideae is strongly supported as monophyletic. It is probably sister to Scilloideae. Recent treatments have divided Brodiaeoideae (or Themidaceae) into 12 genera. The monophyly of several of the genera remains in doubt. As currently circumscribed, the largest genera are Triteleia, with 15 species, and Brodiaea, with 14. Nine of the 12 genera are known in cultivation, but only species of Brodiaea and Triteleia are commonly grown.

== Description ==
The following description is derived from two sources.

Perennial herbs arising from a starchy corm; a new corm arising each year from the old one.

Leaves linear, often fleshy, forming a closed sheath at their base. Veins parallel.

Inflorescence an umbel, or rarely a single flower, at the apex of a solitary scape. Flowers bisexual, actinomorphic. Tepals all similar, in 2 whorls of 3.

Fertile stamens 6, or 3 and alternating with 3 staminodes. Stamens and staminodes inserted on tepals. Anthers basifixed and introrse.

Ovary superior and trilocular.

Fruit a loculicidal capsule. Seed covered with phytomelan.

== History ==
For most of the 19th and 20th centuries, when the group was recognized at all, it was usually at tribal rank and usually called Brodiaeeae. Most authors assigned it to Liliaceae, Alliaceae, or Amaryllidaceae. In 1985, Dahlgren, Clifford, and Yeo treated it as tribe Brodiaeeae of Alliaceae.

Toward the end of the 20th century, it became increasingly evident that the heterogeneous Liliaceae recognized by most authors was several times polyphyletic and that Brodiaea and its relatives were closer to Asparagus than to Allium or Amaryllis. For these reasons, the family Themidaceae was resurrected in an article in Taxon in 1996. The name 'Themidaceae' was first used by Richard Salisbury in 1866. The name was based on the now-defunct genus Themis, which was established by Salisbury along with the family. The only species ever assigned to Themis was Themis ixioides. Its name was changed to Brodiaea ixioides by Sereno Watson in 1879, then to Triteleia ixioides by Edward Lee Greene in 1886. It is known as Triteleia ixioides in Flora of North America.

When the Angiosperm Phylogeny Group published the APG II system in 2003, Themidaceae was treated as an optional circumscription for those who thought that Asparagaceae sensu lato should be divided into smaller segregate families. When the APG III system was published in 2009, Themidaceae was not accepted. In an accompanying article, it was treated as Brodiaeoideae, one of 7 subfamilies in Asparagaceae.

== Genera ==
11 genera were included in the Angiosperm Phylogeny Website as of May 2016. Since then, two additional genera, Dipterostemon and Xochiquetzallia, have been recognized. As of 2026, Brodiaeoideae consists of the following 13 genera:

- Androstephium Torr.
- Bessera Schult.f. (including Behria)
- Bloomeria Kellogg
- Brodiaea Sm.
- Dandya H.E.Moore
- Dichelostemma Kunth (including Brevoortia, Stropholirion)
- Dipterostemon Rydb.
- Milla Cav. (including Diphalangium)
- Muilla S.Watson ex Benth.
- Petronymphe H.E.Moore
- Triteleia Douglas ex Lindl. (including Hesperoscordium, Themis)
- Triteleiopsis Hoover
- Xochiquetzallia J.Gut

== Bibliography ==
- Pires, J. C.; Sytsma, K. J. (1 August 2002). "A phylogenetic evaluation of a biosystematic framework: Brodiaea and related petaloid monocots (Themidaceae)". American Journal of Botany. 89 (8): 1342–1359. doi:10.3732/ajb.89.8.1342. PMID 21665737.
