= T. laxa =

T. laxa may refer to:

- Trabecula laxa, a sea snail species found in the Gulf of Mexico
- Trichopilia laxa, an orchid species found from western South America to Venezuela
- Triteleia laxa, the Ithuriel's spear or grassnut, a lily species native to California

== See also ==
- Laxa (disambiguation)
