= P. nobilis =

P. nobilis may refer to:

- Peltodoris nobilis, the sea lemon or noble dorid, a colorful sea slug species
- Petaurista nobilis, the Bhutan giant flying squirrel, a rodent species found in Bangladesh, Bhutan, China, India and Nepal
- Pinna nobilis, the noble pen shell, a bivalve mollusk species
- Pitcairnia nobilis, a plant species native to Ecuador
- Polymixia nobilis, the stout beardfish, a fish species

== Synonyms ==
- Pilumna nobilis, a synonym for Trichopilia fragrans, an orchid species found from Caribbean to southern tropical America

== See also ==
- Nobilis (disambiguation)
