= T. crispa =

T. crispa may refer to:

- Tinospora crispa, a vine in the family Menispermaceae
- Trichopilia crispa, an orchid in the genus Trichopilia
- Tritonia crispa, an iris in the genus Tritonia
