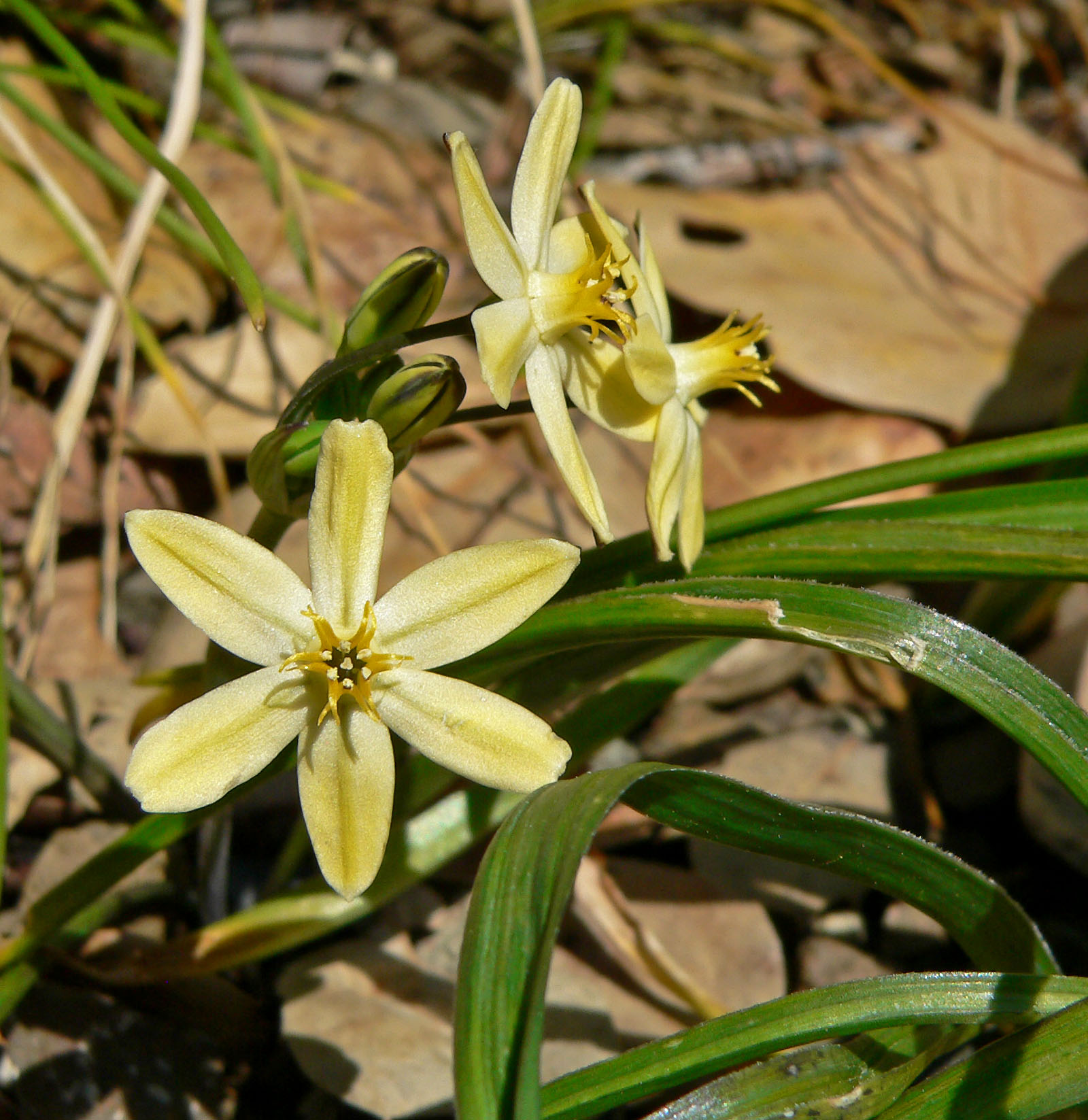
- ssp. scabra

Scientific classification
- Kingdom: Plantae
- Clade: Tracheophytes
- Clade: Angiosperms
- Clade: Monocots
- Order: Asparagales
- Family: Asparagaceae
- Subfamily: Brodiaeoideae
- Genus: Triteleia
- Species: T. ixioides

Binomial name
- Triteleia ixioides (W.T.Aiton) Greene

Synonyms
- Brodiaea lutea

= Triteleia ixioides =

Species of flowering plant

Triteleia ixioides, known as prettyface or golden star, is a monocotyledon flowering plant in the genus Triteleia. It is native to northern and central California and southwestern Oregon, where it can be found in coastal and inland coniferous forests and other habitat. It is a perennial wildflower growing from a corm. It produces one to two basal leaves up to 50 centimeters long by 1.5 wide. The inflorescence arises on an erect stem up to 80 centimeters tall. It is an umbel-like cluster of several flowers each borne on a pedicel up to 7 centimeters long. The flowers are variable in size, measuring one to nearly three centimeters in length. They are pale to bright yellow, or sometimes purple-tinged white. There are six tepals with darker midveins in shades of green, brown, or purple. The lobes are funnel-shaped and may open flat or somewhat reflexed. The six stamens form a fused tube that protrudes from the corolla; they have broad, flat filaments and whitish, yellowish, or blue anthers.

== Description ==
Triteleia ixioides is a perennial, herbaceous, monocotyledon plant growing from an underground corm. The plant produces one or two grass-like, linear leaves about 10–50 cm (4–20 in) long by 3–15 mm (0.1–0.6 in) wide that emerge from the top of the corm in early spring. Like an onion, the leaves have a keel (longitudinal ridge) on the underside and a channel on the upper side with straight margins and a smooth surface. In mature plants, the leaves are followed by production of a stiff, cylindrical scape (flower stalk) that is 10–80 cm (4–30 in) tall, 1–5 mm (0.04–0.2 in) diameter, and is mostly smooth although sometimes scabrous at the base.

At the top of the scape are several thin green bracts that enclose the developing buds. As the flowers emerge these membranes peel back and shrivel. The flowers are borne in an umbel (like an onion flower), with each on a slightly upcurved pedicel 1–9 cm (0.4–4 in) long (up to 12 cm (5 in) in subspecies cookii) connected to the top of the scape.

As with all Triteleia species, each flower has six tepals (three in an outer whorl and three in an inner whorl) that are fused into a perianth tube at the base but then separate into distinct lobes surrounding the mouth of the flower. Triteleia ixioides flowers range from straw-colored to golden yellow (or very occasionally white flushed with purple), with the colors of the upper and lower tepal surfaces similar. Each lobe has a distinct single midvein, which is generally brown or purple (or occasionally green). Flowers are 12–27 mm (0.5–1 in) long overall. The perianth tube is relatively short (3–10 mm (0.1–0.4 in)) with an acute base. (Triteleia dudleyi is a similar, but less common species from high elevations in the Sierra Nevada that has a much longer tube with a rounded base.) The six free tepal lobes are 6–20 mm (0.2–0.8 in) long and are generally perpendicular to the tube but may range from ascending to reflexed.

Inside the flower, the stamen filaments provide the primary identifying character separating Triteleia ixioides from related species, and distinguishing among the five described subspecies. Each stamen is attached to the corresponding tepal at the same height, but they alternate between short filaments (attached to the outer whorl of tepals) and long filaments (attached to the inner whorl). The filaments are dilated (broad) and flattened and each has a forked pair of apical appendages that extend above the anther attachment. The appendages on the three longer filaments are pointed and conspicuous.

The anthers are 1–2 mm (0.04–0.08 in) long and may be colored white, cream, yellow or blue. Anther color was at one time used as a character to identify some subspecies, but is no longer regarded as a reliable guide. The ovary is longer that the stipe supporting it. Fertilized flowers form ovoid, capsular fruits that are loculicidally dehiscent (i.e. they split vertically down the center of each of the three chambers when ripe). The seeds are black and somewhat spherical with a ridge on one side. The seed surface has relatively large irregularly distributed pits and at a finer scale is granulate or granulate–reticulate (i.e. bumpy with elements of a net-like arrangement). The seed coat has a crust.

Triteleia ixioides exhibits a considerable amount of polyploidy and reported chromosome numbers are 2n = 10, 14, 16, 24, 32, 40, 42, 50.

== Taxonomy and phylogeny ==
Triteleia ixioides was first formally described (under the name Ornithogalum ixioides) by William Townsend Aiton in the second edition of Hortus Kewensis in 1811, based on a specimen collected by Archibald Menzies "in California". Aiton's published description was likely actually written by botanist Jonas Carlsson Dryander, working as a librarian for Joseph Banks, and so the author citation is given as "Dryand. ex W.T.Aiton". The specific epithet ixioides means "like Ixia", in reference to a slight similarity to that unrelated monocot genus from southern Africa.

In common with many Triteleia species, Triteleia ixioides was the subject of substantial nomenclatural confusion during the 19th and early 20th centuries. A significant part of that confusion stemmed from rivalry between botanist Richard Anthony Salisbury and members of Britain's scientific establishment such as James Smith. In many cases, Salisbury rushed out his own descriptions of new taxa based on talks he had heard at institutions such as the Royal Society before they could be published by the genuine identifier.

In 1866, Richard Anthony Salisbury created the genus Themis and placed this species into it as Themis ixioides.

In 1879, Baker placed the species under the genus Milla (Baker. In: J. Linn. Soc., Bot. 11: 383. (1870)).

In 1879, S. Watson placed the species under the genus Brodiaea (S.Watson. In: Proc. Amer. Acad. Arts 14: 238. (1879)).

In 1886, Edward Lee Greene published a wholesale re-evaluation of Triteleia and related genera.

In 1891, Kuntze placed it in Hookera (Kuntze. In: Revis. Gen. Pl. 2: 712. (1891)).

In 1894, Edward Lee Greene placed it in Calliprora (Greene. In: Man. Bot. San Francisco: 318. (1894)).

=== Phylogeny and subspecies ===
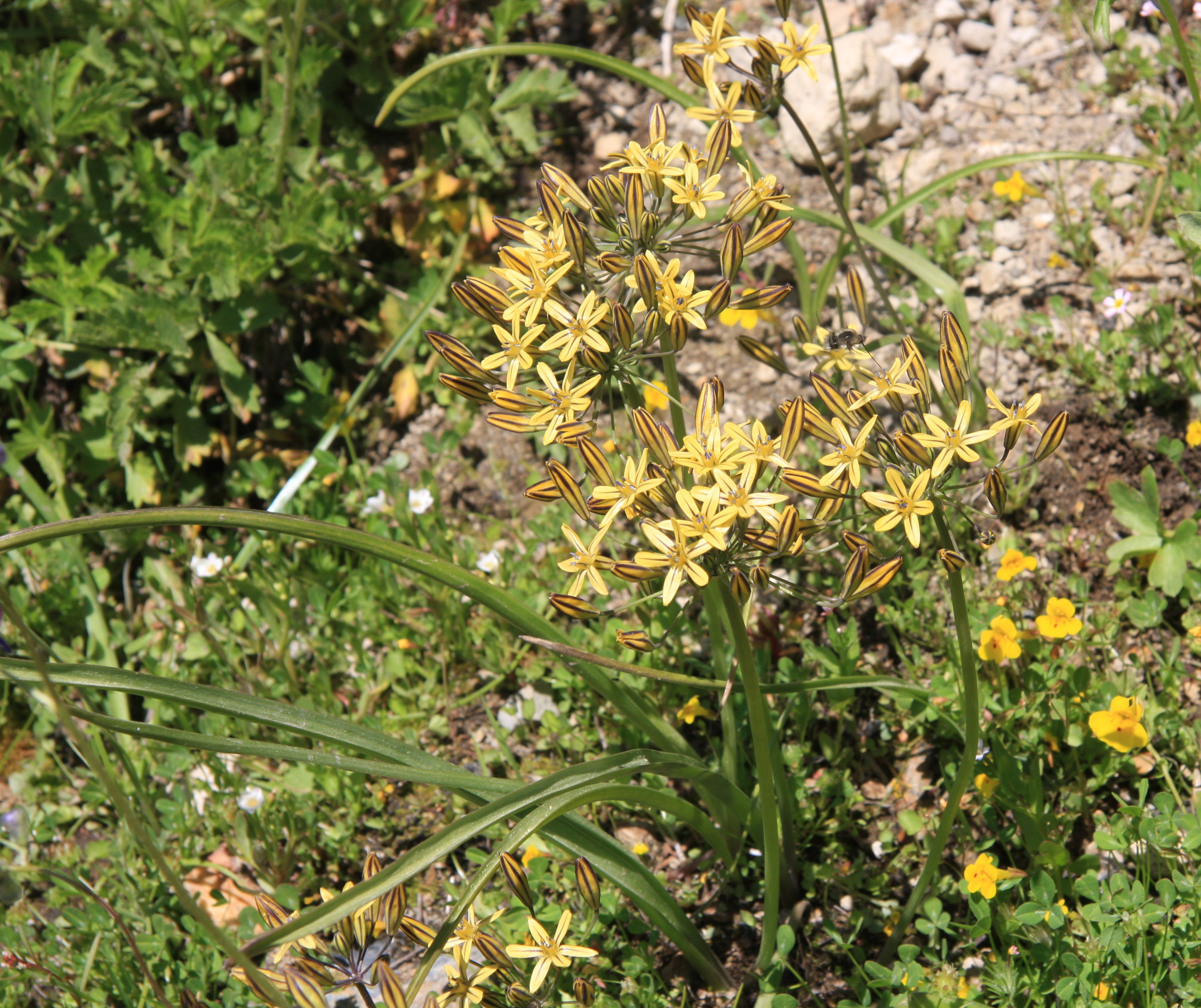
Triteleia ixioides subsp. analina, plant (eastern High Sierras)

There are five recognized subspecies: Triteleia ixioides ssp. analina, Triteleia ixioides ssp. cookii, Triteleia ixioides ssp. ixioides, Triteleia ixioides ssp. scabra, Triteleia ixioides ssp. unifolia.

== Distribution and habitat ==
Triteleia ixioides grows mostly in California, in an arc from the Transverse Ranges north through the Sierra Nevada, into the southern Cascade Range and the southeast slopes of the Klamath Range.

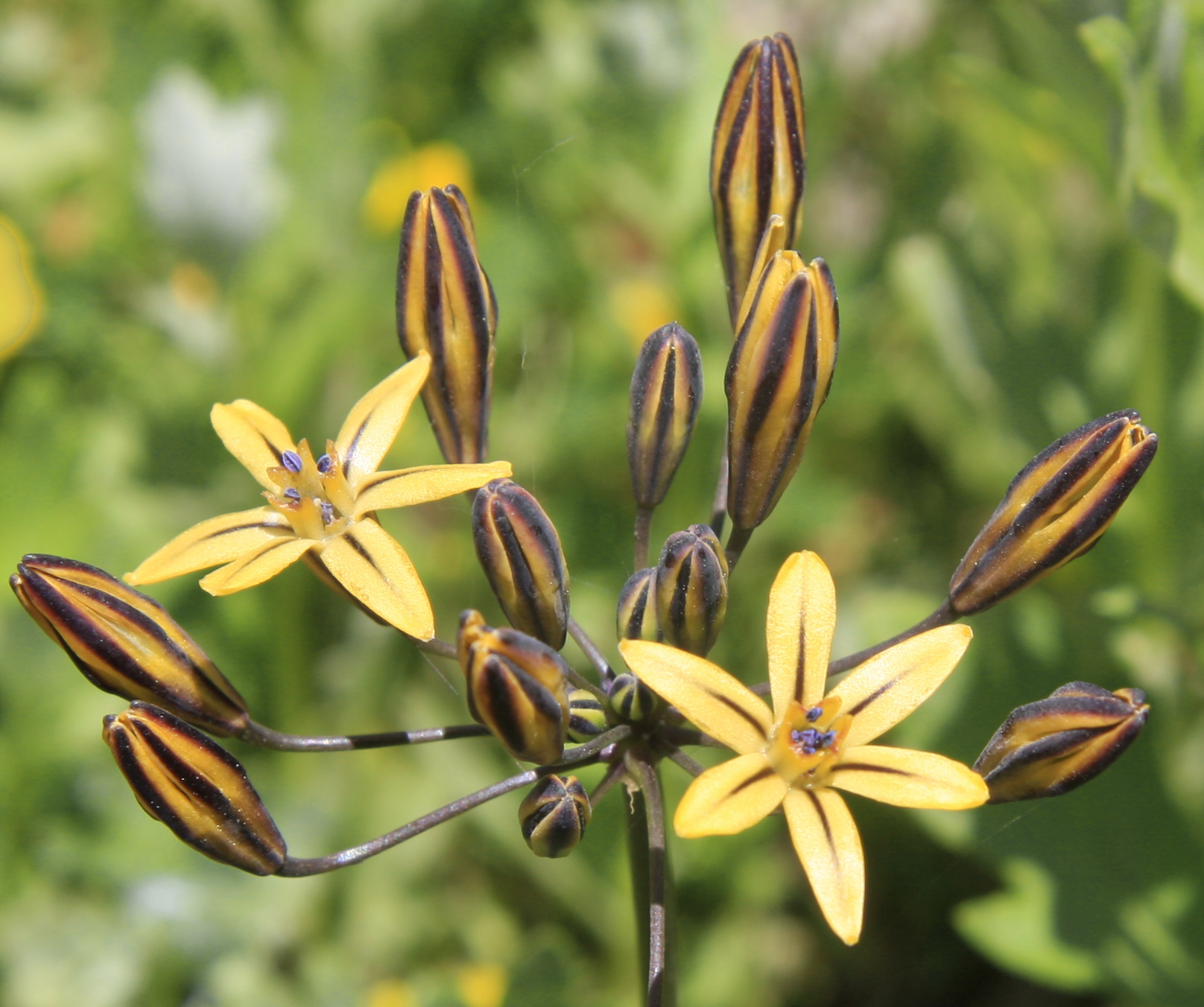
Triteleia ixioides subsp. analina, flowers, showing blue anthers, fused tube, and brown-striped, yellow flowers and buds

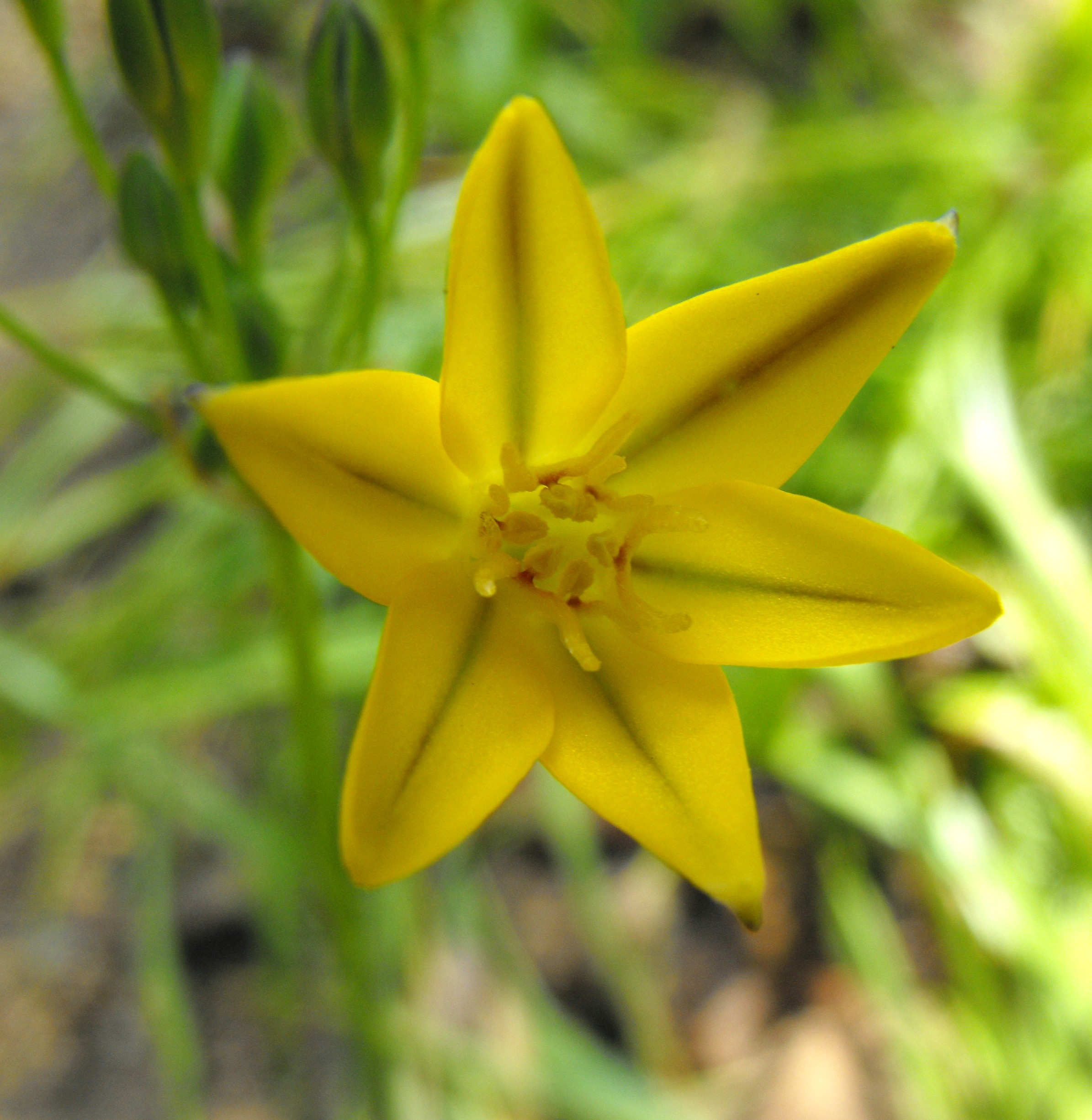
Triteleia ixioides subsp. ixioides

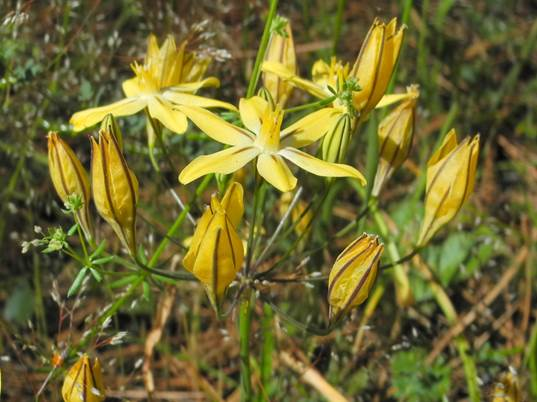
Triteleia ixioides subsp. scabra

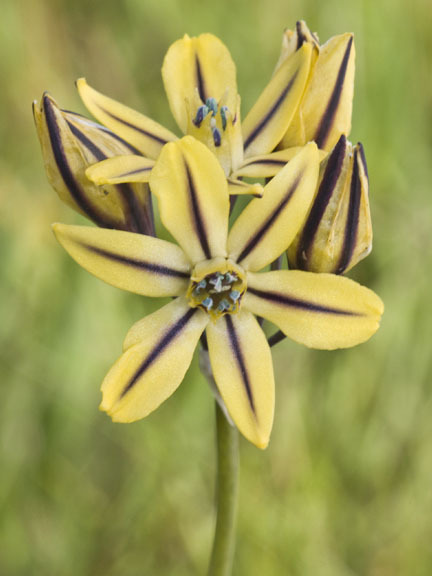
Triteleia ixioides subsp. unifolia

== Sources ==
- Aiton, W.; Aiton, W. T. (1811). Hortus Kewensis. Vol. 2.
- Anderson, M. Kat; Roderick, Wayne (June 8, 2018). "Golden Brodiaea. Triteleia ixioides (Ait. f.) Greene" (PDF). Natural Resources Conservation Service PLANTS Database. USDA.
- Everett, Thomas H., ed. (1982). "Triteleia". Ste-Zy. The New York Botanical Garden Illustrated Encyclopedia of Horticulture. Vol. 10. New York: Garland. pp. 3408–3409. ISBN 978-0-8240-7240-7.
- Greene, Edward Lee (1886), "Studies in the botany of California and parts adjacent. V. Some genera which have been confused under the name Brodiaea.", Bulletin of the California Academy of Sciences, 2, California Academy of Sciences
- Pires, J. Chris (2002a). "Triteleia". In Flora of North America Editorial Committee (ed.). Flora of North America North of Mexico (FNA). Vol. 26. New York and Oxford: Oxford University Press – via eFloras.org, Missouri Botanical Garden, St. Louis, Missouri and Harvard University Herbaria, Cambridge, Massachusetts.
- Pires, J. Chris (2002b). "Triteleia ixioides". In Flora of North America Editorial Committee (ed.). Flora of North America North of Mexico (FNA). Vol. 26. New York and Oxford: Oxford University Press – via eFloras.org, Missouri Botanical Garden, St. Louis, Missouri and Harvard University Herbaria, Cambridge, Massachusetts.
- Pires, J. Chris; Keator, Glenn (2017a). "Triteleia ixioides". Jepson eFlora (Revision 5 ed.). Jepson Flora Project.
- Pires, J. Chris; Keator, Glenn (2017b). "Triteleia ixioides subsp. anilina". Jepson eFlora (Revision 5 ed.). Jepson Flora Project.
- Pires, J. Chris; Keator, Glenn (2017c). "Triteleia ixioides subsp. cookii". Jepson eFlora (Revision 5 ed.). Jepson Flora Project.
- Pires, J. Chris; Keator, Glenn (2017d). "Triteleia ixioides subsp. ixioides". Jepson eFlora (Revision 5 ed.). Jepson Flora Project.
- Pires, J. Chris; Keator, Glenn (2017e). "Triteleia ixioides subsp. scabra". Jepson eFlora (Revision 5 ed.). Jepson Flora Project.
- Pires, J. Chris; Keator, Glenn (2017f). "Triteleia ixioides subsp. unifolia". Jepson eFlora (Revision 5 ed.). Jepson Flora Project.
- Preston, Robert (2012). "How the brodiaeas got their name". Fremontia. 40: 16–23.
- Salisbury, Richard Anthony (1866). Gray, J. E. (ed.). The Genera of Plants. A Fragment Containing Part of Liriogamae.
