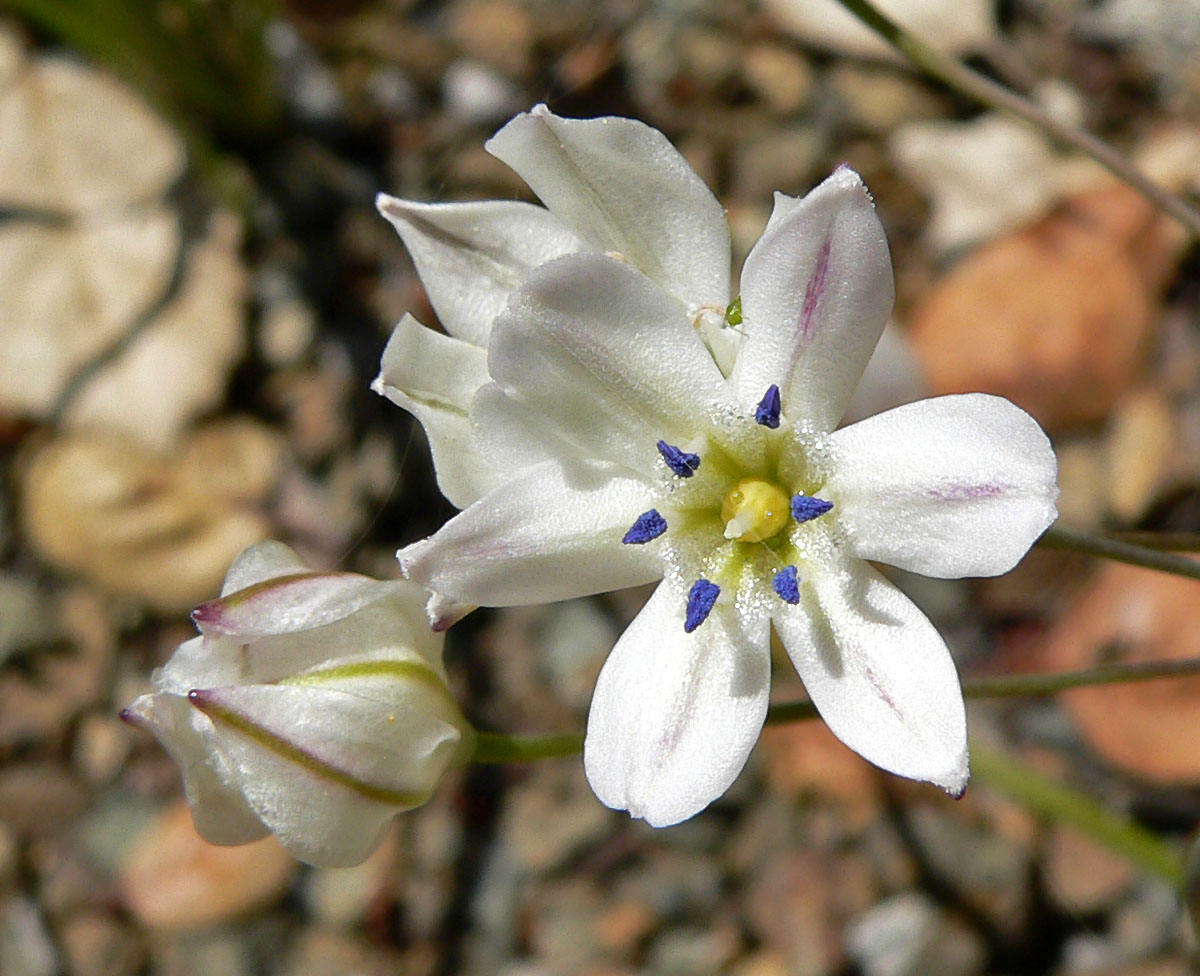

Scientific classification
- Kingdom: Plantae
- Clade: Tracheophytes
- Clade: Angiosperms
- Clade: Monocots
- Order: Asparagales
- Family: Asparagaceae
- Subfamily: Brodiaeoideae
- Genus: Triteleia
- Species: T. lilacina

Binomial name
- Triteleia lilacina Greene

= Triteleia lilacina =

Species of flowering plant

Triteleia lilacina, the foothill triteleia, is a monocot flowering plant in the genus Triteleia.

It is endemic to California, where it is limited to the Central Valley and adjacent Sierra Nevada foothills. It occurs on dry hillsides, especially with volcanic soils.

== Description ==
Triteleia lilacina is a perennial wildflower growing from a corm. There are two or three basal leaves measuring up to 40 centimeters long by 2 wide.

The inflorescence arises on an erect stem up to 60 centimeters tall. It is an umbel-like cluster of several flowers each borne on a pedicel up to 5 centimeters long. The white flower is somewhat bowl-shaped with shiny, glasslike vesicles in the center. The six stamens have purplish anthers.
