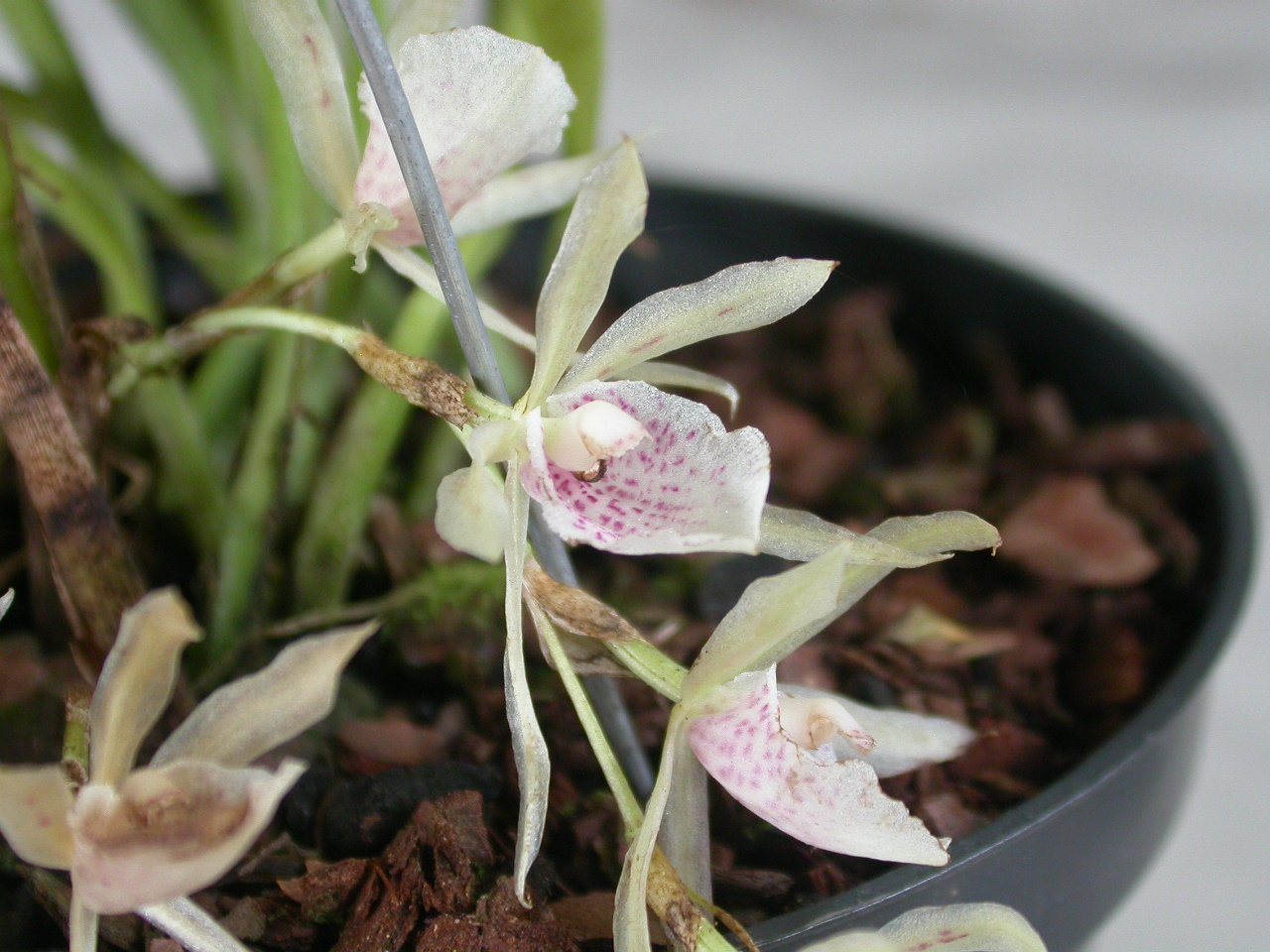
- Trichopilia brasiliensis flowers

Scientific classification
- Kingdom: Plantae
- Clade: Tracheophytes
- Clade: Angiosperms
- Clade: Monocots
- Order: Asparagales
- Family: Orchidaceae
- Subfamily: Epidendroideae
- Genus: Trichopilia
- Species: T. brasiliensis

Binomial name
- Trichopilia brasiliensis Cogn.

Synonyms
- Leucohyle brasiliensis (Cogn.) Schltr.

= Trichopilia brasiliensis =

Species of orchid

Trichopilia brasiliensis is a species of orchid endemic to the Brazil state of Goiás.
