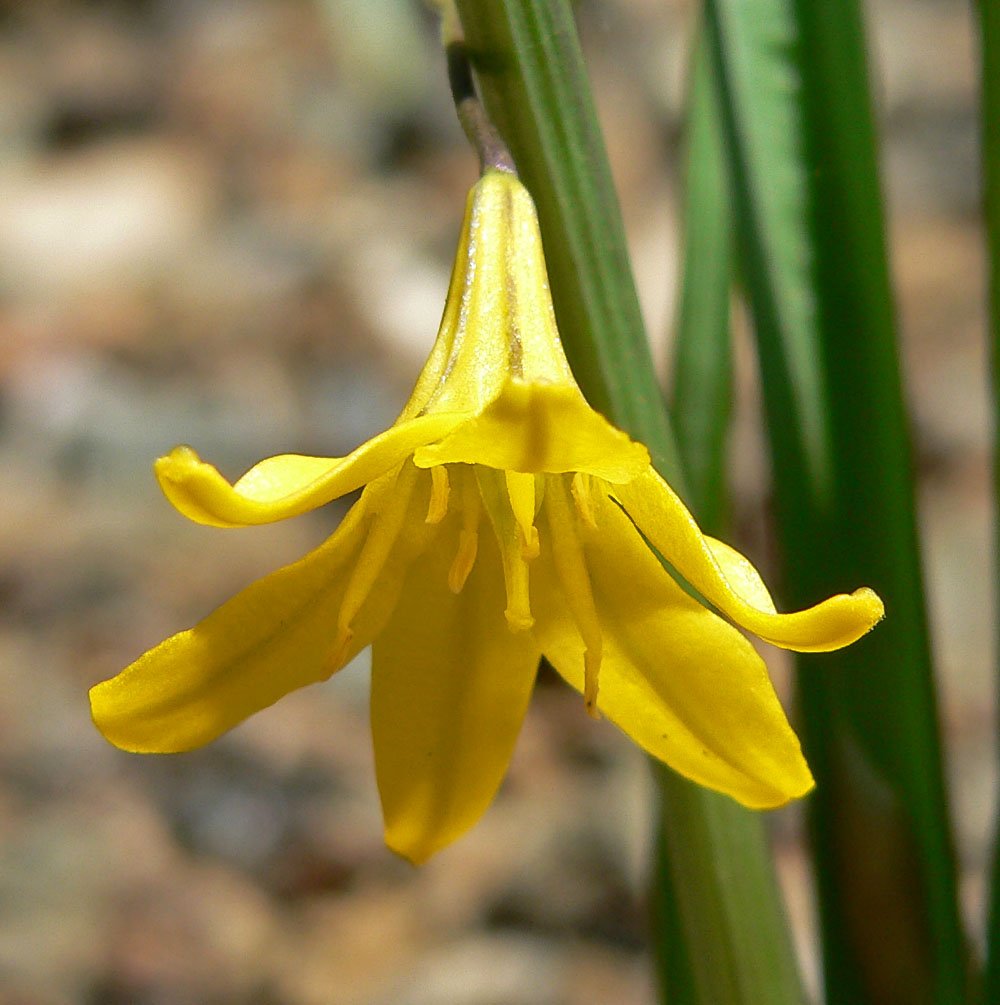
- Triteleia crocea var. crocea

Scientific classification
- Kingdom: Plantae
- Clade: Tracheophytes
- Clade: Angiosperms
- Clade: Monocots
- Order: Asparagales
- Family: Asparagaceae
- Subfamily: Brodiaeoideae
- Genus: Triteleia
- Species: T. crocea

Binomial name
- Triteleia crocea (Alph.Wood) Greene

= Triteleia crocea =

Species of flowering plant

Triteleia crocea, with the common names yellow triteleia and yellow tripletlily, is a monocot flowering plant in the genus Triteleia.

== Distribution ==
The plant is native to northern California and into southern Oregon.

It occurs in the Klamath Mountains and the southernmost slopes of the Cascade Range. Its habitats include Yellow pine forests.

== Description ==
Triteleia crocea is a perennial herb growing from a corm. It produces two or three leaves up to 40 centimeters long by one wide.

The inflorescence arises on an erect stem up to 30 centimeters tall. It is an umbel-like cluster of many flowers each borne on a slender pedicel. The flowers are usually bright yellow but some specimens from the Trinity Mountains have light blue corollas. They may have green stripes. The corolla has six lobes one half to one centimeter long and six stamens with yellow or blue anthers.

The bloom period is May and June.

=== Varieties ===
Varieties include

- Triteleia crocea var. crocea — Yellow triteleia, listed Vulnerable species.
- Triteleia crocea var. modesta — Trinity Mountains pretty face, endemic to Trinity Mountains, listed Vulnerable species.
