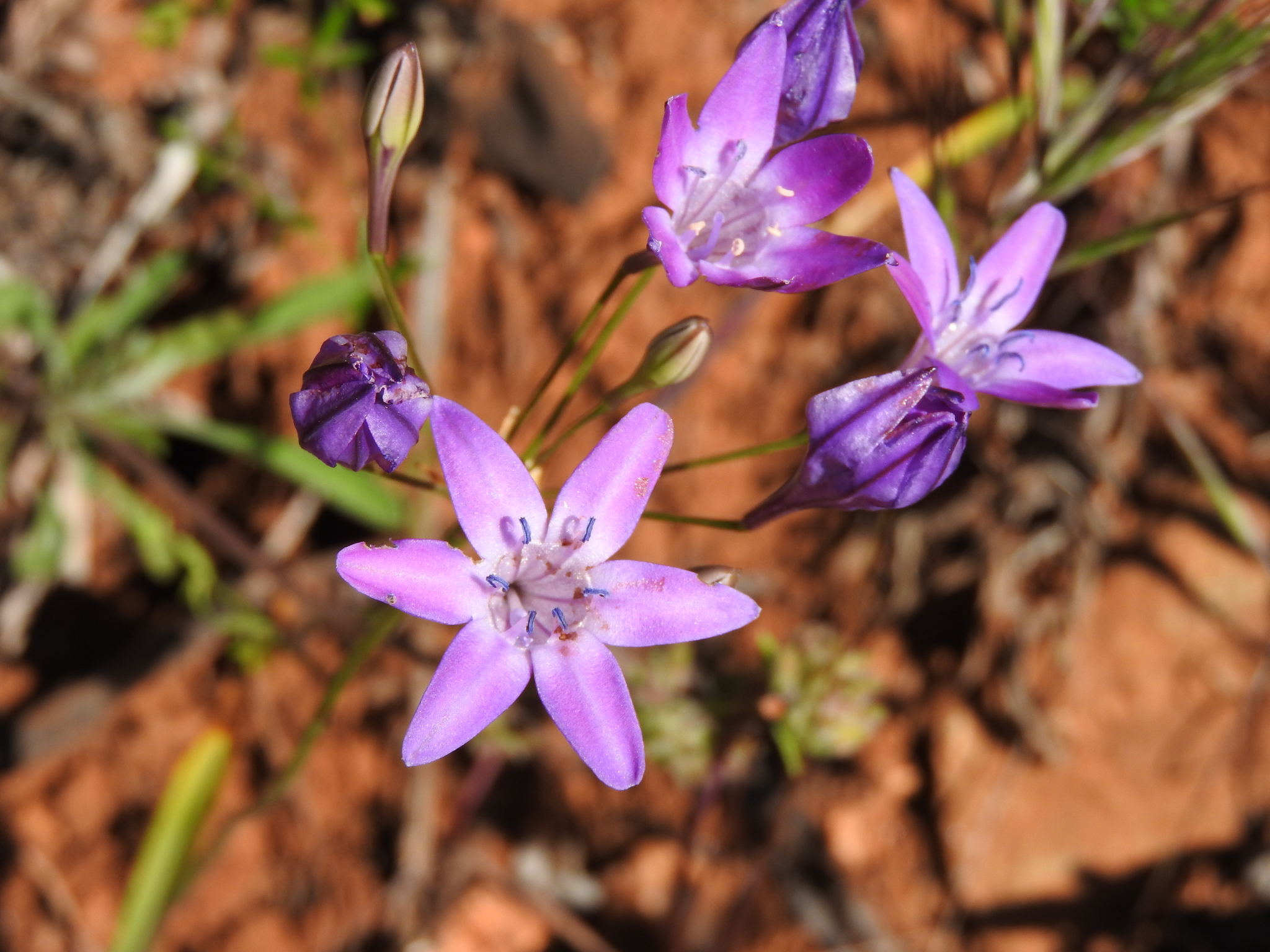

Conservation status
- Apparently Secure (NatureServe)

Scientific classification
- Kingdom: Plantae
- Clade: Tracheophytes
- Clade: Angiosperms
- Clade: Monocots
- Order: Asparagales
- Family: Asparagaceae
- Subfamily: Brodiaeoideae
- Genus: Triteleia
- Species: T. bridgesii

Binomial name
- Triteleia bridgesii (S.Wats.) Greene

= Triteleia bridgesii =

Species of flowering plant

The triplet lily Triteleia bridgesii (previously Brodiaea bridgesii) is known by the common name Bridges' brodiaea. It is found in the foothills and low elevation mountains of California and Oregon, often in areas of serpentine soil.

It is an attractive perennial flower often planted as an ornamental. The plant sends up long, erect green stems which branch near the top into several smaller stems which bear the blooms. The flowers are bright purple or lavender, tubular at first and then opening into six-pointed star shapes.
