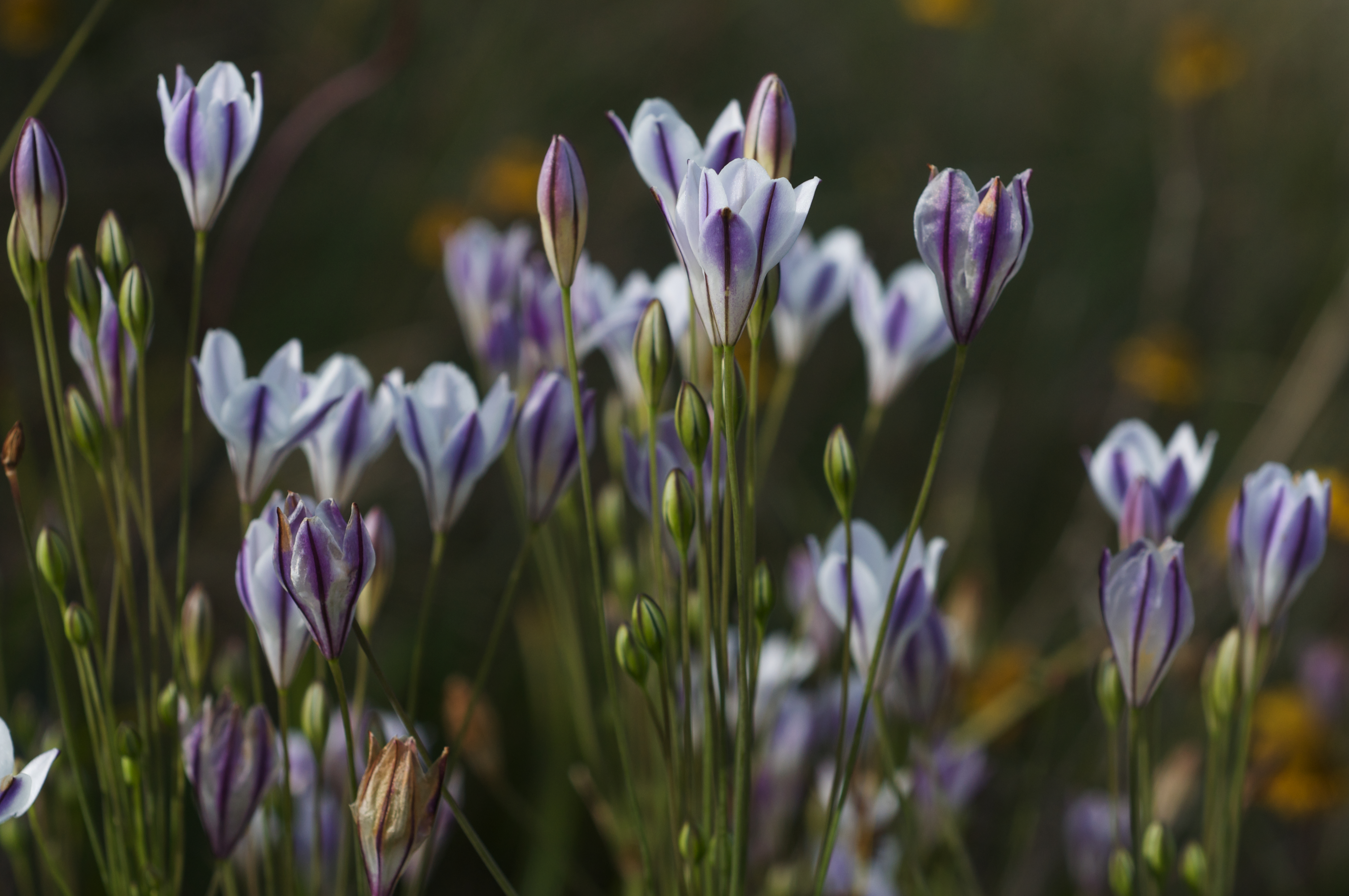

Scientific classification
- Kingdom: Plantae
- Clade: Tracheophytes
- Clade: Angiosperms
- Clade: Monocots
- Order: Asparagales
- Family: Asparagaceae
- Subfamily: Brodiaeoideae
- Genus: Triteleia
- Species: T. peduncularis

Binomial name
- Triteleia peduncularis Lindl.

= Triteleia peduncularis =

Species of flowering plant

Triteleia peduncularis is a monocot flowering plant in the genus Triteleia. Its common names include long-ray brodiaea and longray triteleia. It is endemic to California, where it occurs in the coastal and inland mountain ranges of the northern and central sections of the state. It grows in vernally moist habitat such as meadows, grassland, and vernal pools, often in areas with serpentine soils. It is a perennial wildflower growing from a corm. There are two or three basal leaves measuring up to 40 cm (16 in) long and 1.5 cm (0.6 in) wide. The inflorescence arises on a smooth, erect stem up to 80 cm (31 in) tall. It is an umbel-like cluster of several flowers which are borne on very long, straight pedicels measuring up to 18 cm (7.1 in) long. Each funnel-shaped flower is white, often tinged purple, with six tepals up to 1.6 cm (0.6 in) in length. There are six stamens with white anthers, and the ovary at the center is yellow when the flower is young.
