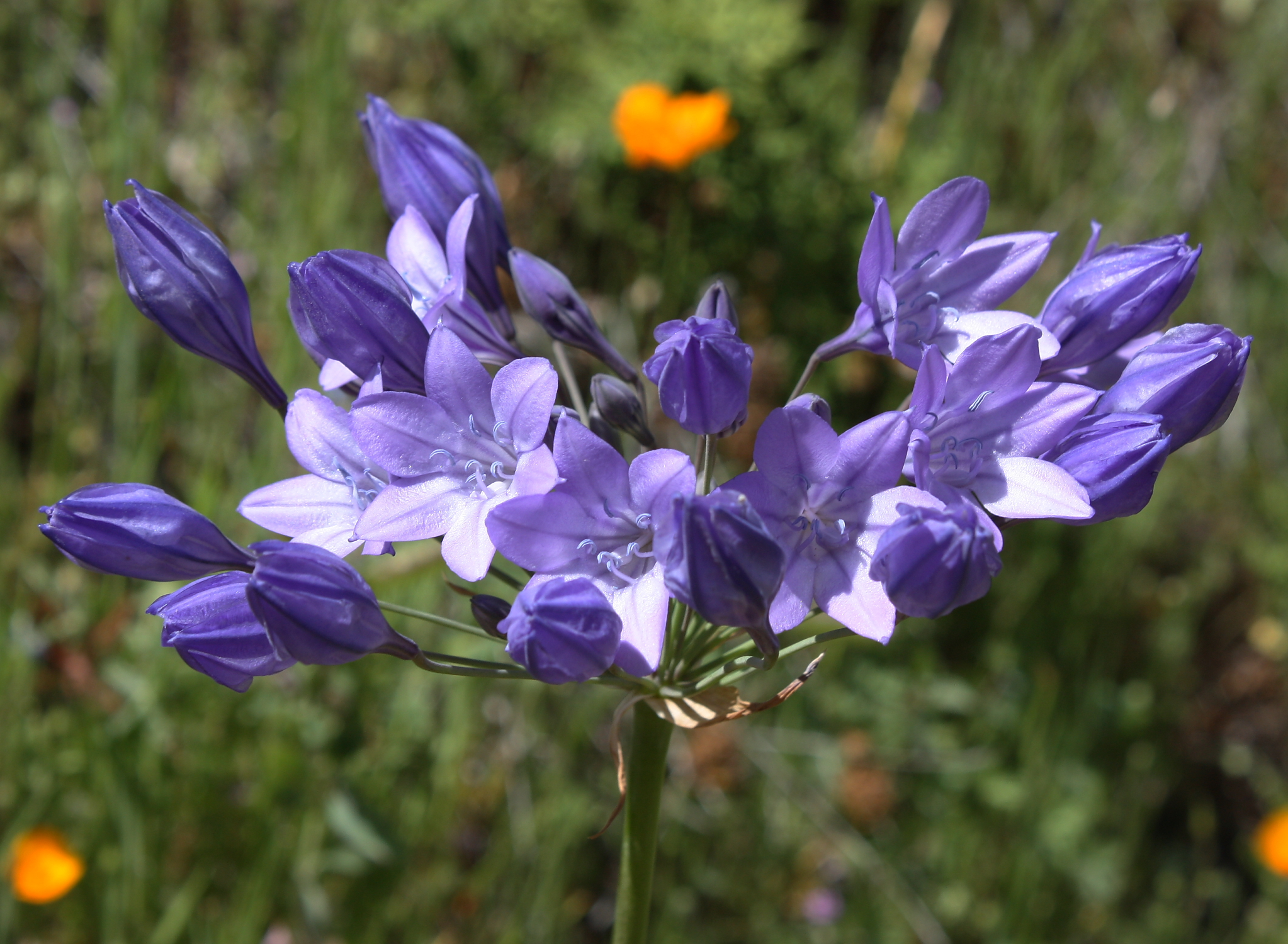
- Ithuriel's spear (Triteleia laxa)

Scientific classification
- Kingdom: Plantae
- Clade: Tracheophytes
- Clade: Angiosperms
- Clade: Monocots
- Order: Asparagales
- Family: Asparagaceae
- Subfamily: Brodiaeoideae
- Genus: Triteleia; Douglas ex Lindl.

Synonyms
- Hesperoscordium Lindl.; Calliprora Lindl.; Tulophos Raf.; Scaduakintos Raf.; Seubertia Kunth; Veatchia Kellogg; Themis Salisb.

= Triteleia =

Triplet lilies

Genus of flowering plants

Triteleia is a genus of monocotyledon flowering plants also known as triplet lilies. The 16 species are native to western North America, from British Columbia south to California and east to Wyoming and Arizona, with one species in northwestern Mexico. However, they are most common in California. They are perennial plants growing from a fibrous corm roughly spherical in shape. They get their name from the fact that all parts of their flowers come in threes.

== Taxonomy and systematics ==
The Angiosperm Phylogeny Group's 2009 revision placed the genus in family Asparagaceae, subfamily Brodiaeoideae (having previously placed treated Brodiaeoideae as a separate family Themidaceae). Other modern authors place it in the family Alliaceae. Both these families are in the order Asparagales.

There are currently 16 recognized species in Triteleia. One species, Triteleia ixioides, has five well-defined subspecies. Varieties and subspecies have been proposed within several other Triteleia species, but these are no longer widely accepted. Some common species that are now placed in genus Triteleia were formerly placed in genus Brodiaea, and as a consequence the word "brodiaea" has been incorporated into some of their common names.

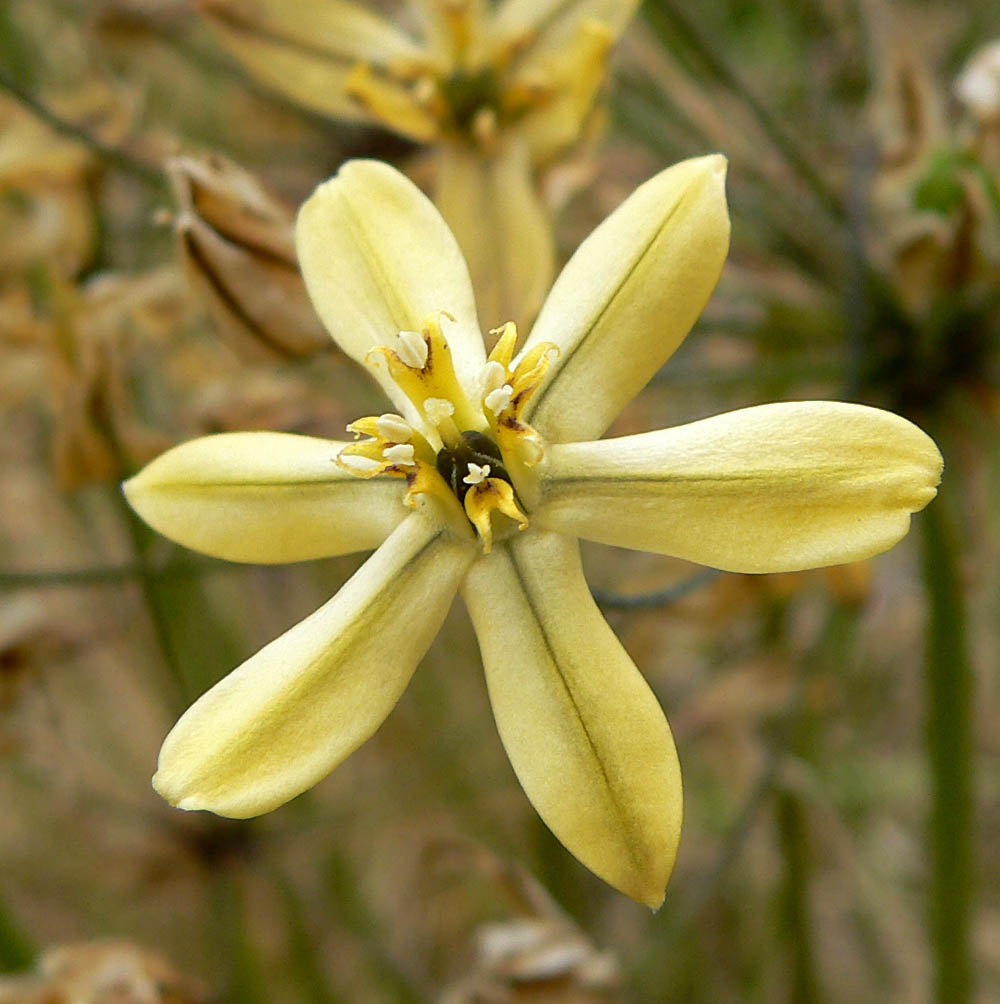
Triteleia ixioides ssp. scabra flower

Image	Scientific name	Common name	Distribution
	Triteleia bridgesii	Bridges' brodiaea	on serpentine soils below 1,200 m (3,900 ft) in northern Sierra Nevada foothills and Klamath Range of northwestern California and southwestern Oregon
	Triteleia clementina	San Clemente Island triteleia	endemic to San Clemente Island, the southernmost of the Channel Islands of California
	Triteleia crocea	Yellow triteleia	on serpentine soils at elevations of 650–2,200 m (2,130–7,220 ft) in the Klamath Range of northern California and southwestern Oregon
	Triteleia dudleyi	Dudley's triteleia	at elevations of 1,200–3,500 m (3,900–11,500 ft) in the Sierra Nevada from Mono County southwards; possibly also in the San Gabriel Range of Los Angeles County
	Triteleia grandiflora	large-flowered triteleia, Howell's triteleia, wild hyacinth	at elevations of 100–3,000 m (330–9,840 ft) in southern British Columbia, Washington, Oregon, Idaho, Montana, Wyoming, Utah, extreme northern California; isolated population in southwestern Colorado
	Triteleia guadalupensis	jacinto del desierto	endemic to Guadalupe Island off the west coast of Baja California
	Triteleia hendersonii	Henderson's triteleia	at elevations of 100–3,000 m (330–9,840 ft) in southwestern Oregon and extreme northern California
	Triteleia hyacinthina	white triteleia, white brodiaea, hyacinth brodiaea, fool's onion	common below 2,000 m (6,600 ft) in much of British Columbia, Washington, Oregon, California; also western Nevada and northern Idaho
	Triteleia ixioides	prettyface, golden brodiaea	California north of the Transverse Ranges; the five subspecies have mostly separate distributions:
	Triteleia laxa	Ithuriel's spear, grassnut, wallybasket	common below 1,500 m (4,900 ft) across from much of California; from the Tehachapi Mountains north along the western slopes of the Sierra Nevada and southern Cascade ranges, and in the Coast Ranges north from the Santa Lucia Mountains through the Bay Area to the Klamath Range as far as southwestern Oregon
	Triteleia lemmoniae	Oak Creek triplet lily, Lemmon's star	on the Mogollon Rim southeast of Flagstaff, Arizona, with an elevation range of 980–2,340 m (3,220–7,680 ft)
	Triteleia lilacina	lilac prettyface	on volcanic hills and mesas at elevations of 70–200 m (230–660 ft) in the northern Sierra Nevada foothills of California
	Triteleia lugens	Coast Range triteleia	two populations in the Coast Ranges of California, one around Pinnacles National Park and the other around the Sonoma and Napa valleys, north of San Francisco; possibly a third population in the San Gabriel Range of Los Angeles County
	Triteleia montana	mountain triteleia	at elevations of 1,200–3,000 m (3,900–9,800 ft) in the central and northern Sierra Nevada and southern Cascade ranges of California
	Triteleia peduncularis	longray triplet lily, long-rayed Brodiaea	in wet grassland and near vernal streams and pools on serpentine soils below 800 m (2,600 ft) in coastal counties of northern California
	Triteleia piutensis	Piute Mountains triteleia	described in April 2014 from two populations in the Piute Mountains of the southern Sierra Nevada in Kern County, California, at elevations of 1,560–1,680 m (5,120–5,510 ft)

- Triteleia × versicolor – Pinto triplet lily – a sterile hybrid believed to be T. hyacinthina × T. ixioides, recorded only from the type specimen collected in 1935 at Whaler's Knoll in Point Lobos State Park, Monterey County

A 2002 phylogenetic review of related genera found four clades within Triteleia that were all supported with 100 percent jackknife resampling values:

- Triteleia montana and Triteleia lemmoniae
- Triteleia peduncularis, Triteleia laxa, and Triteleia bridgesii
- Triteleia hyacinthina and Triteleia ixioides
- Triteleia grandiflora, Triteleia crocea, and Triteleia hendersonii

== Sources ==
- Pires, J. Chris; Sytsma, Kenneth J. (August 2002). "A Phylogenetic Evaluation of a Biosystematic Framework: Brodiaea and Related Petaloid Monocots (Themidaceeae)". American Journal of Botany. 89 (8): 1342–1359. doi:10.3732/ajb.89.8.1342. PMID 21665737.
