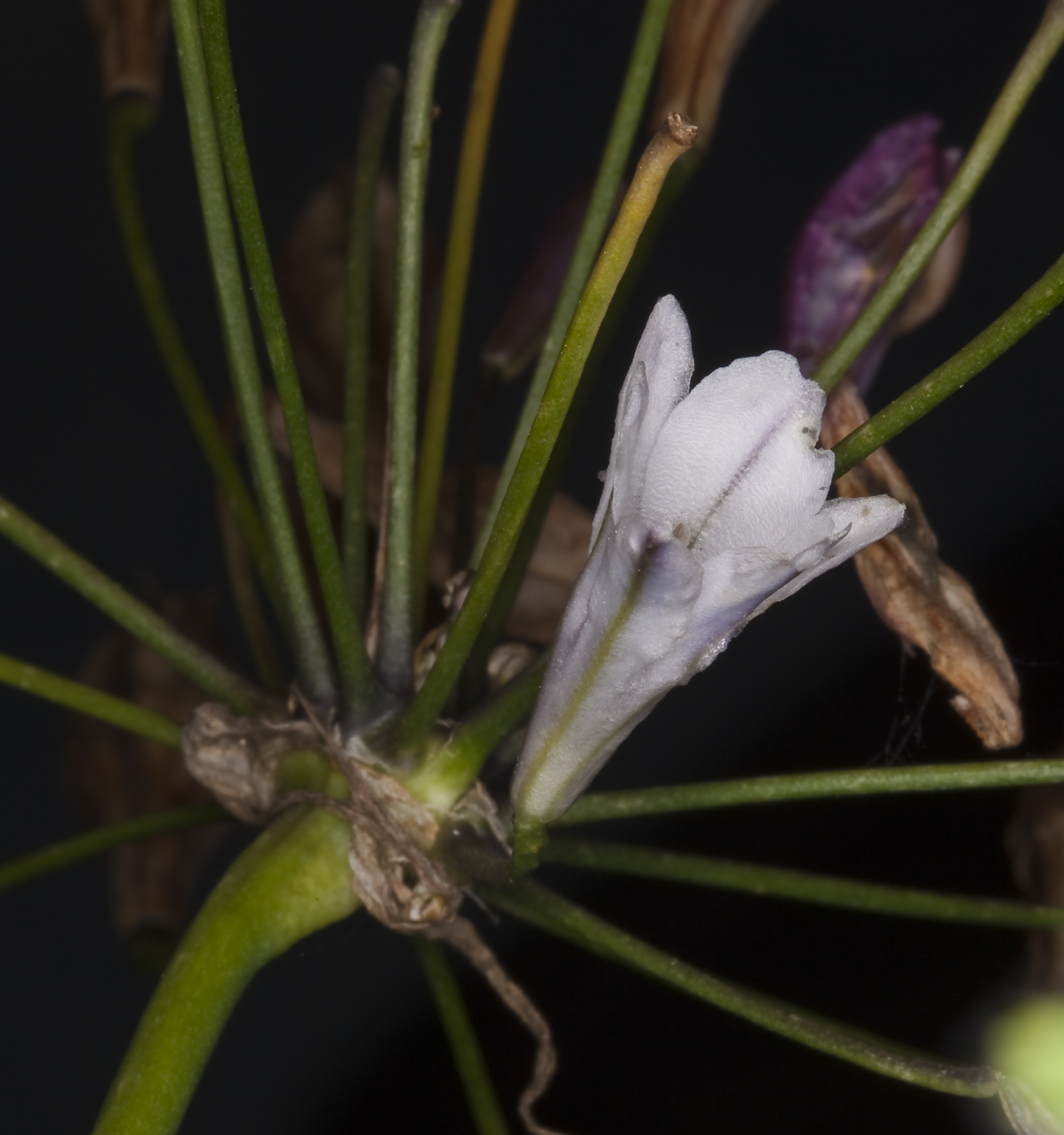

Conservation status
- Imperiled (NatureServe)

Scientific classification
- Kingdom: Plantae
- Clade: Tracheophytes
- Clade: Angiosperms
- Clade: Monocots
- Order: Asparagales
- Family: Asparagaceae
- Subfamily: Brodiaeoideae
- Genus: Triteleia
- Species: T. clementina

Binomial name
- Triteleia clementina Hoover

Synonyms
- Brodiaea clementina

= Triteleia clementina =

San Clemente Island triteleia

Species of flowering plant

Triteleia clementina is a rare species of flowering plant known by the common name San Clemente Island triteleia. It is endemic to San Clemente Island, one of the Channel Islands of California, where it is known from about twenty occurrences. Its habitat includes moist, rocky, seaside grassland. It is a perennial herb growing from a corm. It produces two or three keeled, lance-shaped leaves up to 100 centimeters long by three wide. The inflorescence arises on an erect stem up to 90 centimeters tall and bears an umbel-like cluster of many flowers. Each flower is a funnel-shaped lavender or light blue bloom with six lobes measuring up to 1.5 centimeters long. There are six stamens with purple anthers.

Although this species is found on only one island, the main threat to its existence, herbivory by feral pigs and goats, has been eliminated.
