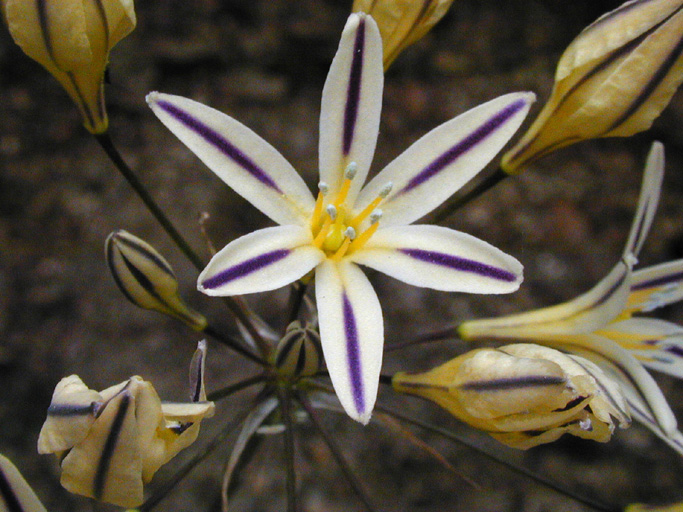

Scientific classification
- Kingdom: Plantae
- Clade: Tracheophytes
- Clade: Angiosperms
- Clade: Monocots
- Order: Asparagales
- Family: Asparagaceae
- Subfamily: Brodiaeoideae
- Genus: Triteleia
- Species: T. hendersonii

Binomial name
- Triteleia hendersonii Greene

Synonyms
- Brodiaea hendersonii

= Triteleia hendersonii =

Species of flowering plant

Triteleia hendersonii, commonly known as Henderson's triteleia, Henderson's stars, or yellow tiger-lily, is a species of flowering plant native to the Pacific Northwest, occurring in Southern Oregon and Northern California.

A variety Triteleia hendersonii var. leachiae is found in the Klamath Mountains within Curry, Coos, and Josephine counties of Oregon. This variety is distinguished by a blue median stripe on each perianth segment. This variety was first described as a species, Brodieaea leachiae.
