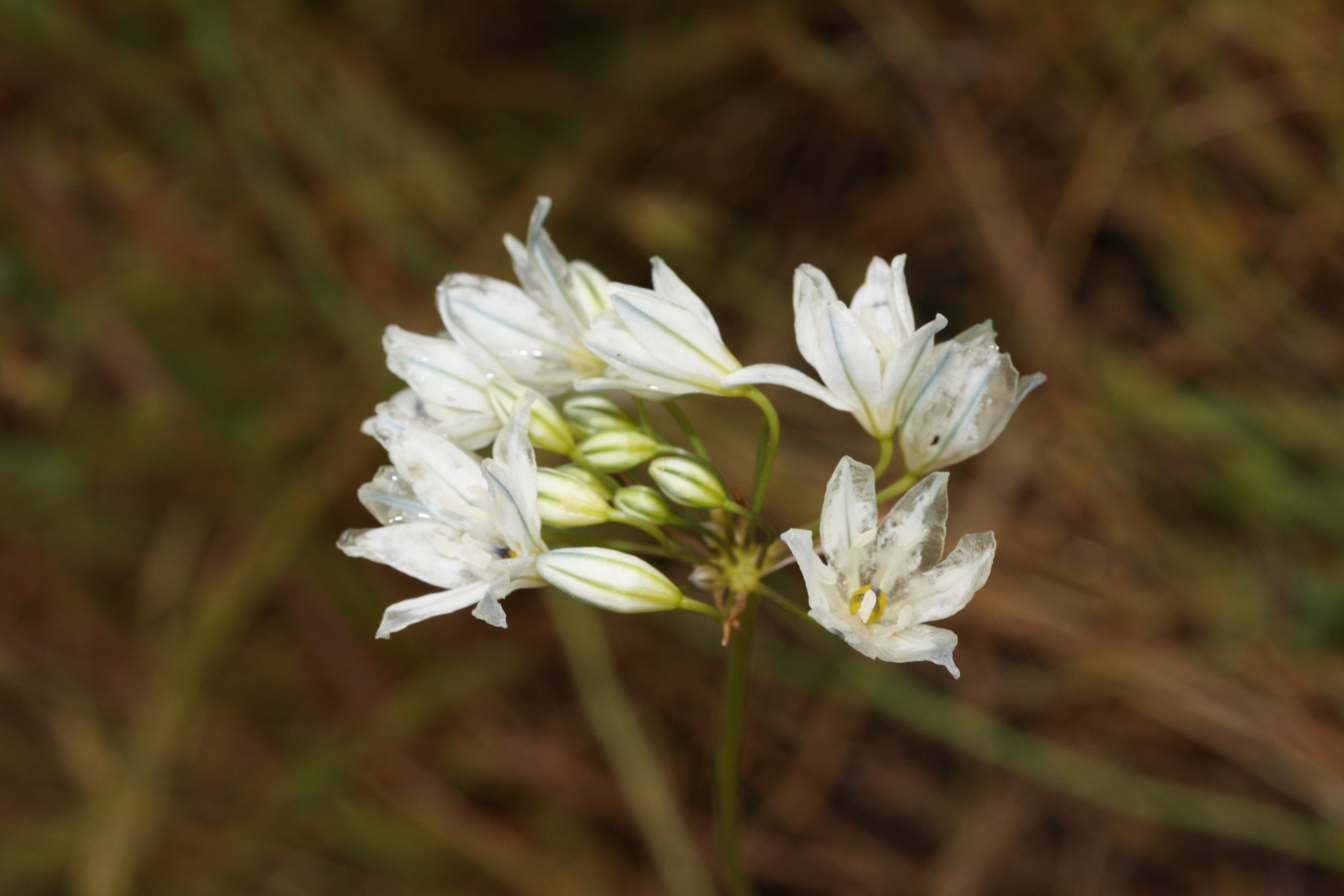

Scientific classification
- Kingdom: Plantae
- Clade: Tracheophytes
- Clade: Angiosperms
- Clade: Monocots
- Order: Asparagales
- Family: Asparagaceae
- Subfamily: Brodiaeoideae
- Genus: Triteleia
- Species: T. hyacinthina

Binomial name
- Triteleia hyacinthina (Lindl.) Greene

Synonyms
- Triteleia hyacinthia

= Triteleia hyacinthina =

Species of flowering plant

Triteleia hyacinthina is a species of flowering plant known by the common names white brodiaea, white tripletlily, hyacinth brodiaea, and fool's onion. It is native to western North America from British Columbia to Idaho to central California. Its habitat includes grassland and vernally moist areas such as meadows and vernal pools. It is a perennial herb growing from a corm. It produces two or three basal leaves up to 40 centimeters (16 in) long by 2 centimeters (0.79 in) wide. The inflorescence arises on an erect stem up to 60 centimeters (24 in) tall and bears an umbel-like cluster of many flowers. Each flower is a funnel-shaped bloom borne on a pedicel up to 5 centimeters (2.0 in) long. The flower is white, often tinged purple along the tubular throat, with six green-veined tepals. There are six stamens with white, yellow, or occasionally blue anthers.

The bulb is edible but does not smell like an onion.
