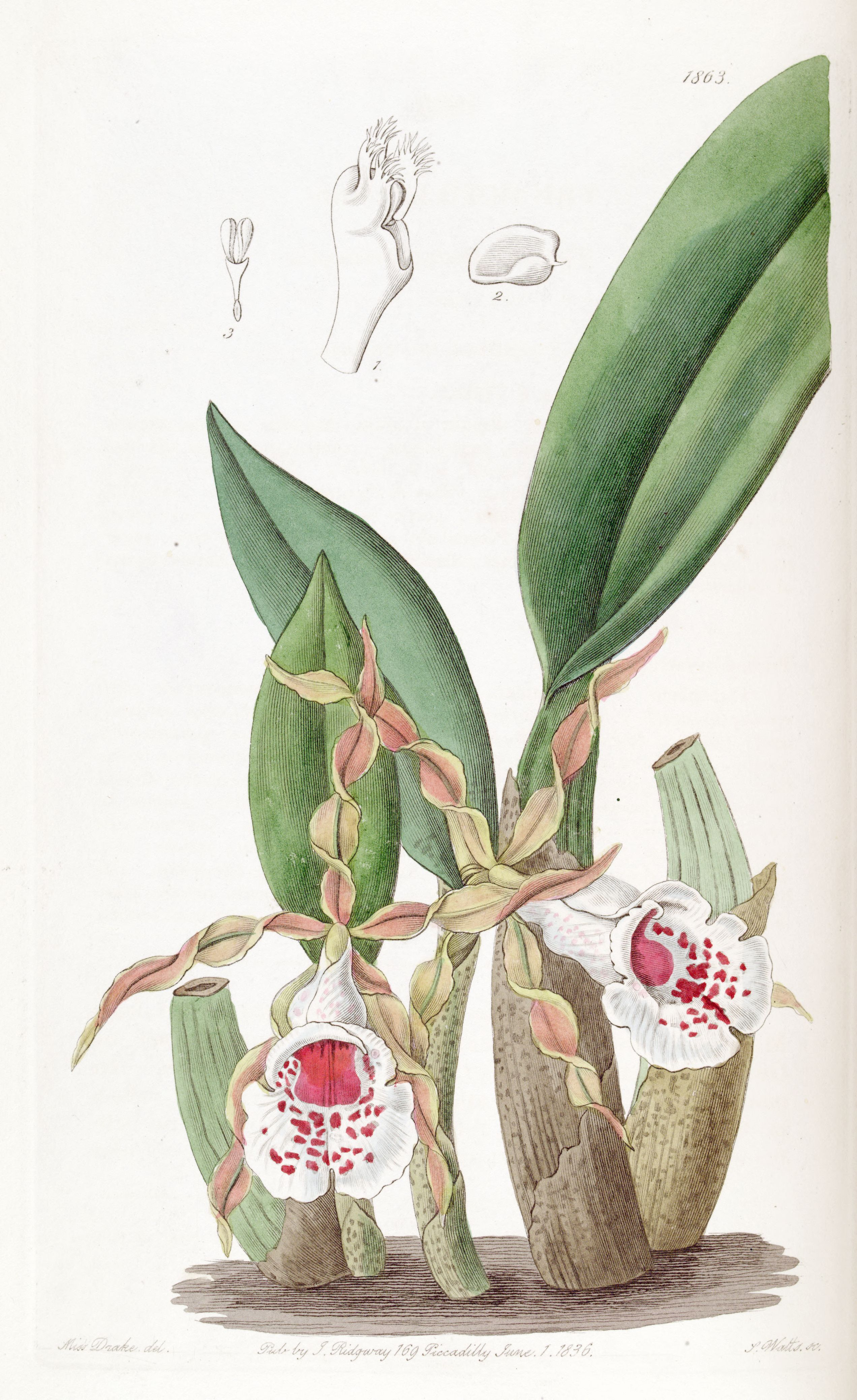
- Trichopilia tortilis illustration

Scientific classification
- Kingdom: Plantae
- Clade: Tracheophytes
- Clade: Angiosperms
- Clade: Monocots
- Order: Asparagales
- Family: Orchidaceae
- Subfamily: Epidendroideae
- Genus: Trichopilia
- Species: T. tortilis

Binomial name
- Trichopilia tortilis Lindl.

= Trichopilia tortilis =

Species of orchid

Trichopilia tortilis is a species of orchid found from Mexico to Central America. It is the type species of the genus Trichopilia.
