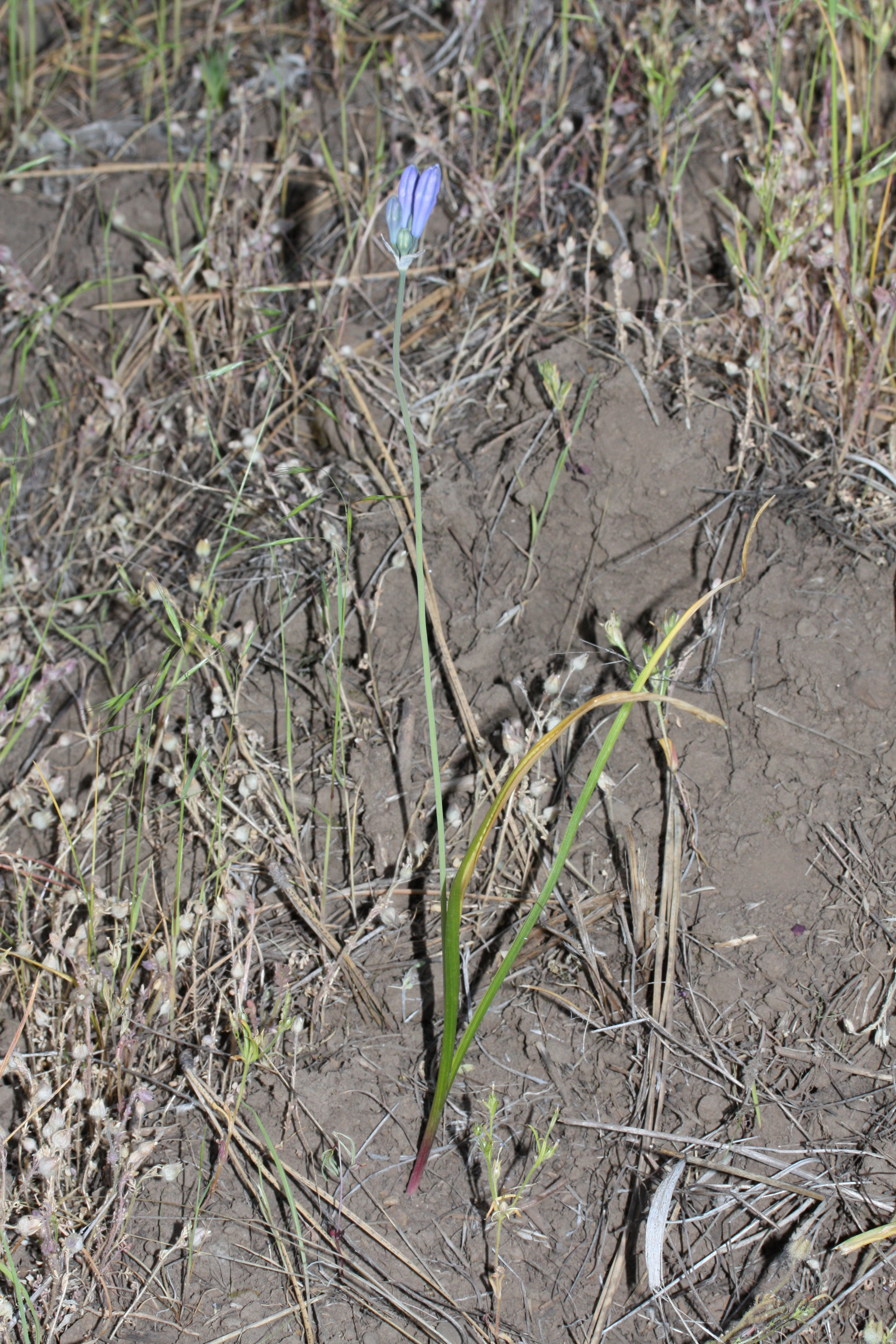
- Triteleia grandiflora in Wenas Wildlife Area, Washington

Conservation status
- Apparently Secure (NatureServe)

Scientific classification
- Kingdom: Plantae
- Clade: Tracheophytes
- Clade: Angiosperms
- Clade: Monocots
- Order: Asparagales
- Family: Asparagaceae
- Subfamily: Brodiaeoideae
- Genus: Triteleia
- Species: T. grandiflora

Binomial name
- Triteleia grandiflora Lindl.

Synonyms
- Tulophos grandiflora (Lindl.) Raf.; Milla grandiflora (Lindl.) Baker; Brodiaea grandiflora (Lindl.) J.F.Macbr. 1918, illegitimate homonym, not Sm. 1811 nor Pursh 1814; Brodiaea grandiflora var. major Benth. ex Baker; Brodiaea douglasii S.Watson; Brodiaea howellii S.Watson; Brodiaea bicolor Suksd.; Hookera bicolor (Suksd.) Piper; Hookera douglasii (S.Watson) Piper; Hookera howellii (S.Watson) Piper; Triteleia bicolor (Suksd.) A.Heller; Brodiaea douglasii var. howellii (S.Watson) M.Peck; Triteleia grandiflora var. howellii (S.Watson) Hoover

= Triteleia grandiflora =

Species of flowering plant

Triteleia grandiflora is a species of flowering plant known by the common names largeflower triteleia, largeflower tripletlily, and wild hyacinth.

== Description ==
Triteleia grandiflora is a perennial herb growing from a corm. It produces two or three basal leaves up to 70 centimetres (28 in) long by 1 cm wide. The inflorescence arises on a smooth, erect stem up to 75 cm (30 in) tall and bears an umbel-like cluster of many blue to white flowers. Each flower is a funnel-shaped bloom borne on a pedicel up to 4 or 5 cm long. The flower may be up to 3.5 cm long including the tubular throat and six tepals each just over 1 cm long. The inner set of three tepals are somewhat ruffled and broader than the outer tepals. The flower corolla may be deep blue to almost white with a darker blue mid-vein. There are six stamens with purple or yellow anthers. The prominent tubular flower throat distinguishes T. grandiflora from Triteleia hyacinthina, whose range overlaps T. grandiflora.

== Distribution and habitat ==
Triteleia grandiflora is native to western North America from British Columbia to extreme northern California, eastward into Idaho, Montana and northern Utah, with disjunct populations occurring in Wyoming and Colorado. Its habitat includes grassland, sagebrush, woodlands, and forests.

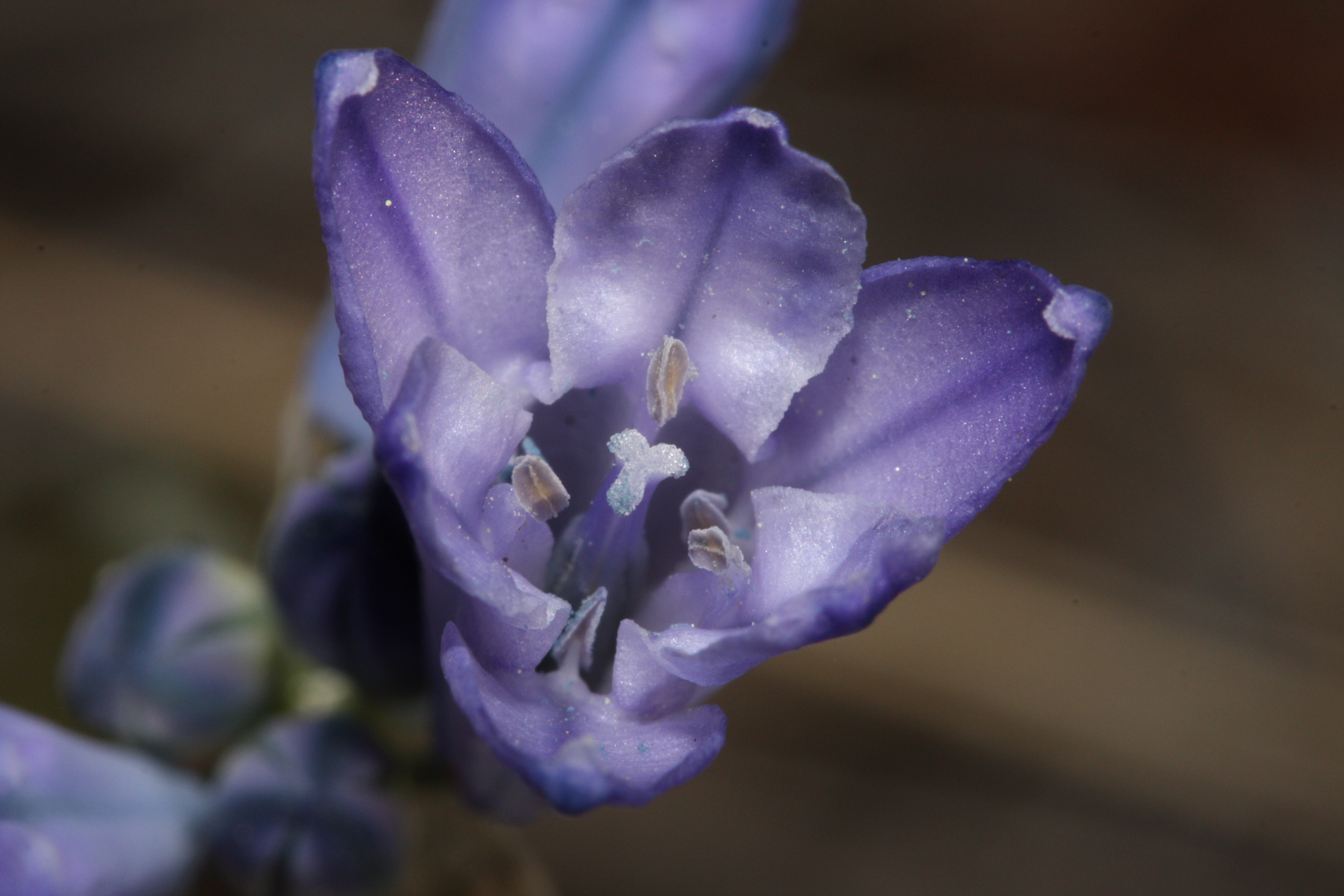
With tubular throat and six tepals, the flower contains six stamens with purple or yellow anthers.

== Uses ==
The corm provides food for various wild rodents and livestock, and Native Americans and settlers also found them edible.

== See also ==
- List of plants known as lily
