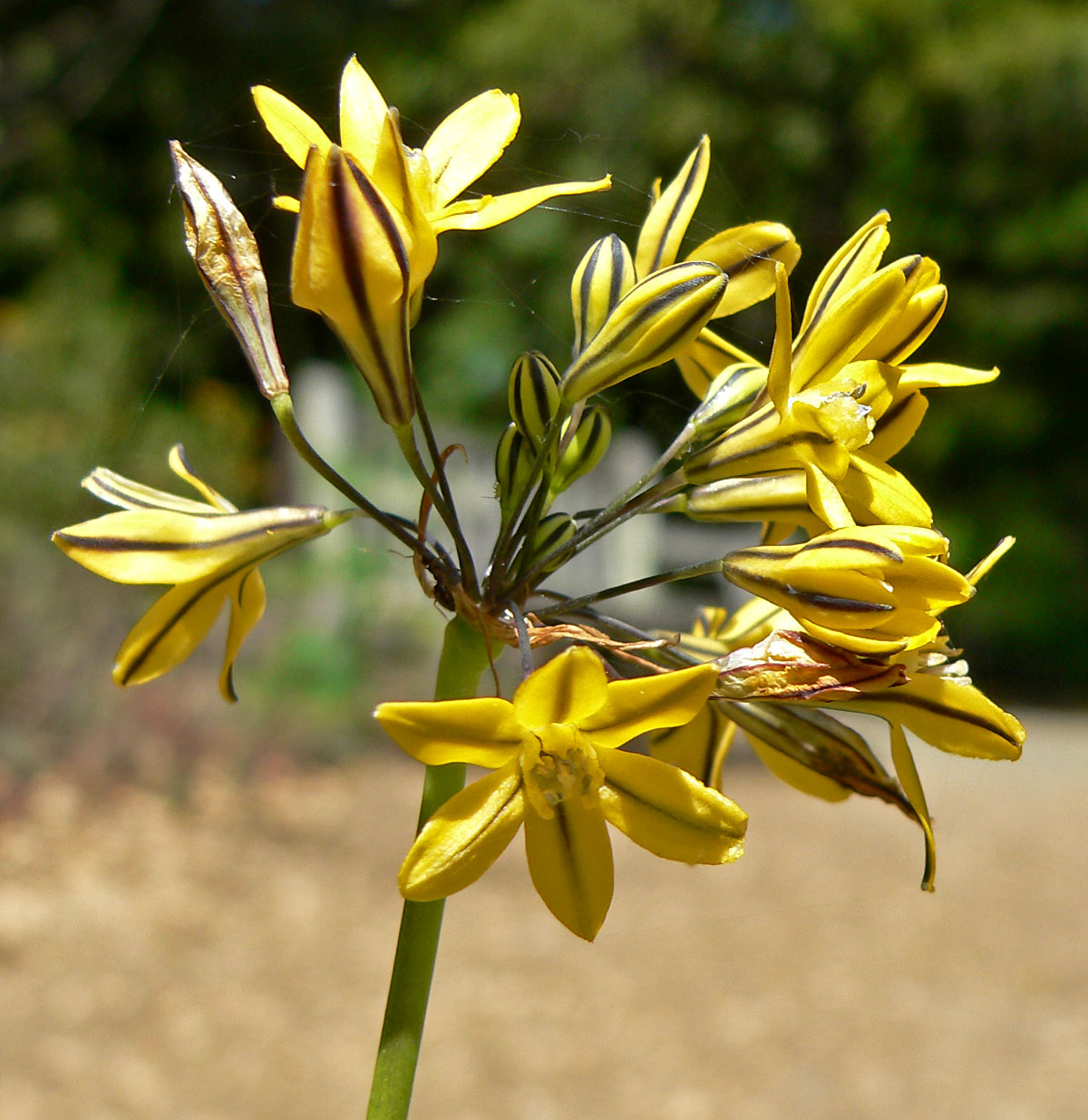

Scientific classification
- Kingdom: Plantae
- Clade: Tracheophytes
- Clade: Angiosperms
- Clade: Monocots
- Order: Asparagales
- Family: Asparagaceae
- Subfamily: Brodiaeoideae
- Genus: Triteleia
- Species: T. lugens

Binomial name
- Triteleia lugens Greene

= Triteleia lugens =

Species of flowering plant

Triteleia lugens, the Coast Range triteleia or dark-mouthed triteleia, is a monocot flowering plant in the genus Triteleia. It is endemic to California, where it is known from the Coast Ranges north and south of the San Francisco Bay Area. Its habitat includes forests and chaparral.

== Description ==
It is a perennial wildflower growing from a corm. It produces two to three basal leaves up to 40 centimeters long by one wide. The inflorescence arises on a smooth, erect stem up to 40 centimeters tall. It is an umbel-like cluster of many funnel-shaped flowers borne on short pedicels.

The flower has six yellow tepals each under a centimeter long. Northern populations have paler yellow flowers, and plants in southern areas have deeper golden yellow flowers. The tepals have dark veins. There are six stamens with yellow or blue anthers.
