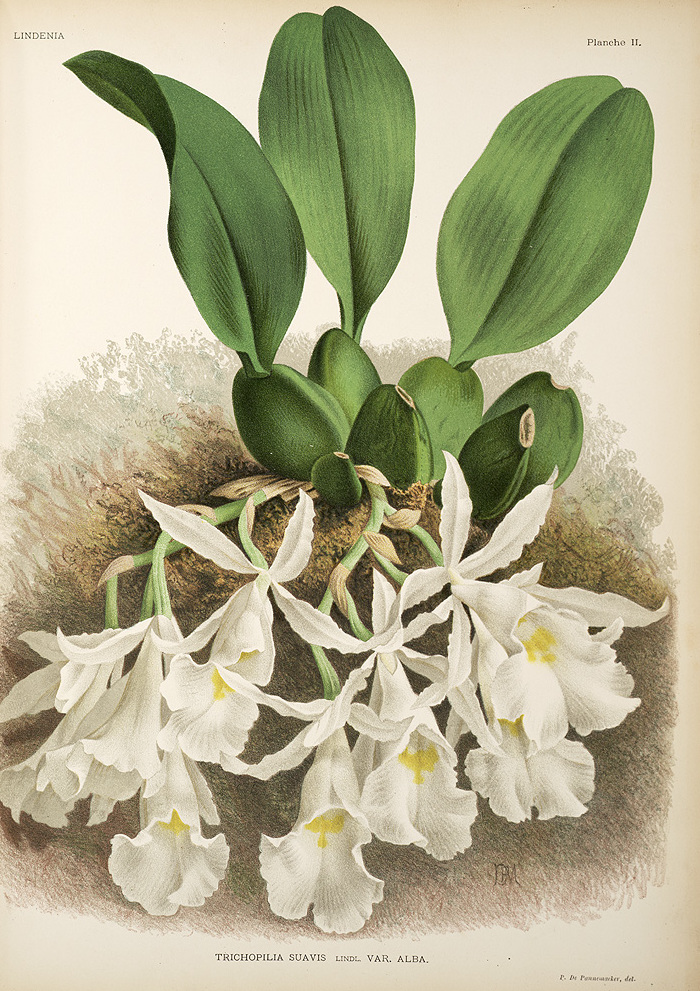
- Trichopilia suavis illustration

Scientific classification
- Kingdom: Plantae
- Clade: Tracheophytes
- Clade: Angiosperms
- Clade: Monocots
- Order: Asparagales
- Family: Orchidaceae
- Subfamily: Epidendroideae
- Genus: Trichopilia
- Species: T. suavis

Binomial name
- Trichopilia suavis Lindl. & Paxton

Synonyms
- Trichopilia kienastiana Rchb.f.; Trichopilia suavis var. alba L.Linden & Rodigas

= Trichopilia suavis =

Species of orchid

Trichopilia suavis is a species of orchid found from Central America to Colombia. It was first collected in Costa Rica in tropical forested habitat from 2,000 to 6,000m in elevation. In 2004, it was considered a common species within the A. M. Brenes biological preserve in Costa Rica, and formed large colonies on the trunks of trees.

== Description ==
It is a pseudobulbous epiphyte growing on the trunks of trees, including Quercus, Trichilia, and Cupania. The flowers are white with red or pink spotting on the sepals and petals, and have a strong, sweet fragrance. The psedobulbs are thin and wide, each sporting a single large leaf.
