= Triteleia lemmoniae =

Oak Creek triteleia

Scientific classification
- Kingdom: Plantae
- Clade: Tracheophytes
- Clade: Angiosperms
- Clade: Monocots
- Order: Asparagales
- Family: Asparagaceae
- Subfamily: Brodiaeoideae
- Genus: Triteleia
- Species: T. lemmoniae

Binomial name
- Triteleia lemmoniae (S.Wats.) Greene

Synonyms
- Brodiaea lemmoniae S.Watson; Hookera lemmoniae (S.Watson) Tidestr.

Species of flowering plant

Triteleia lemmoniae, common names Oak Creek triteleia, Lemmon's star or Oak Creek triplet lily, is a plant species now classed in the family Asparagaceae, although older classifications would have regarded it part of the Liliaceae.

Triteleia lemmoniae is endemic to Arizona, the only member of the genus native to the state. It is an herb up to 30 cm (12 in) tall, with bright yellow or orange flowers.

The species is named for Sara Plummer Lemmon (1836–1923), a well-known American botanist. She and her husband, John Gill (J.G.) Lemmon, lived and worked in Oakland, California but did extensive botanical explorations in Arizona. Several species bear the epithet "lemmonii" in his honor; Triteleia lemmoniae and Mount Lemmon in Arizona were named in hers.
