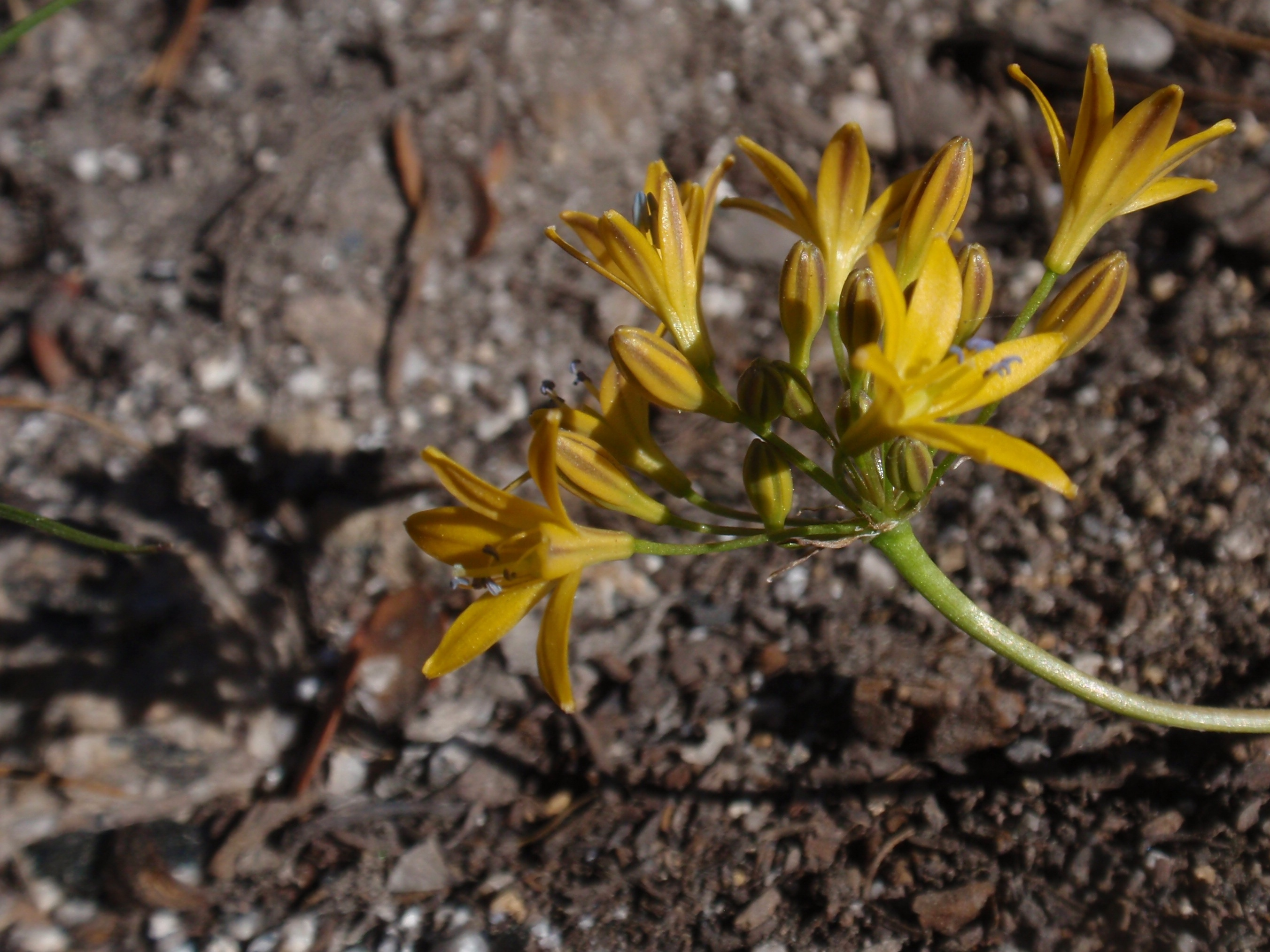

Scientific classification
- Kingdom: Plantae
- Clade: Tracheophytes
- Clade: Angiosperms
- Clade: Monocots
- Order: Asparagales
- Family: Asparagaceae
- Subfamily: Brodiaeoideae
- Genus: Triteleia
- Species: T. montana

Binomial name
- Triteleia montana Hoover

= Triteleia montana =

Species of flowering plant

Triteleia montana is a monocot flowering plant in the genus Triteleia. Its common names include Sierra triteleia, and mountain triteleia. It is endemic to California, where it is limited to the Sierra Nevada. It occurs in coniferous forests on granite soils. The Latin specific epithet montana refers to mountains or coming from mountains. It is a perennial wildflower growing from a corm. There are two or three basal leaves measuring up to 30 centimeters long and just a few millimeters wide. The inflorescence arises on an erect, rough-haired stem up to 25 or 30 centimeters tall. It is an umbel-like cluster of several flowers each borne on a pedicel up to 3 centimeters long. The flower is yellow with a dark midvein, and dries purplish. The funnel-shaped corolla is made up of six tepals up to a centimeter long each. There are six stamens with white or blue anthers.
