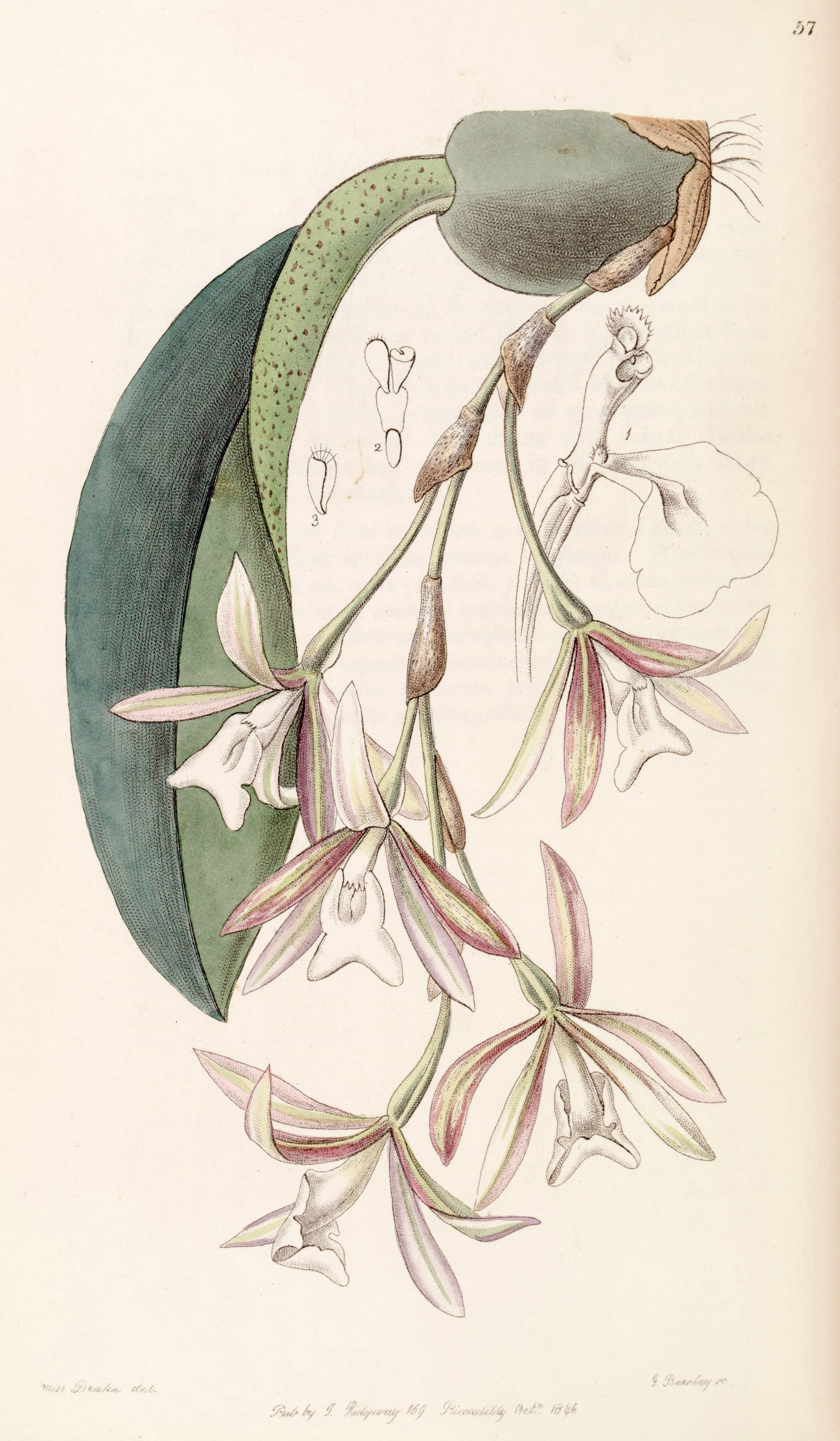
- Trichopilia laxa illustration

Scientific classification
- Kingdom: Plantae
- Clade: Tracheophytes
- Clade: Angiosperms
- Clade: Monocots
- Order: Asparagales
- Family: Orchidaceae
- Subfamily: Epidendroideae
- Genus: Trichopilia
- Species: T. laxa

Binomial name
- Trichopilia laxa (Lindl.) Rchb.f.

Synonyms
- Pilumna laxa Lindl. (basionym); Trichopilia reichenheimia Klotzsch; Trichopilia laxa var. hartwegii Rchb.f.; Trichopilia laxa var. flaveola Rchb.f.

= Trichopilia laxa =

Species of orchid

Trichopilia laxa is a species of orchid found from western South America to Venezuela.
