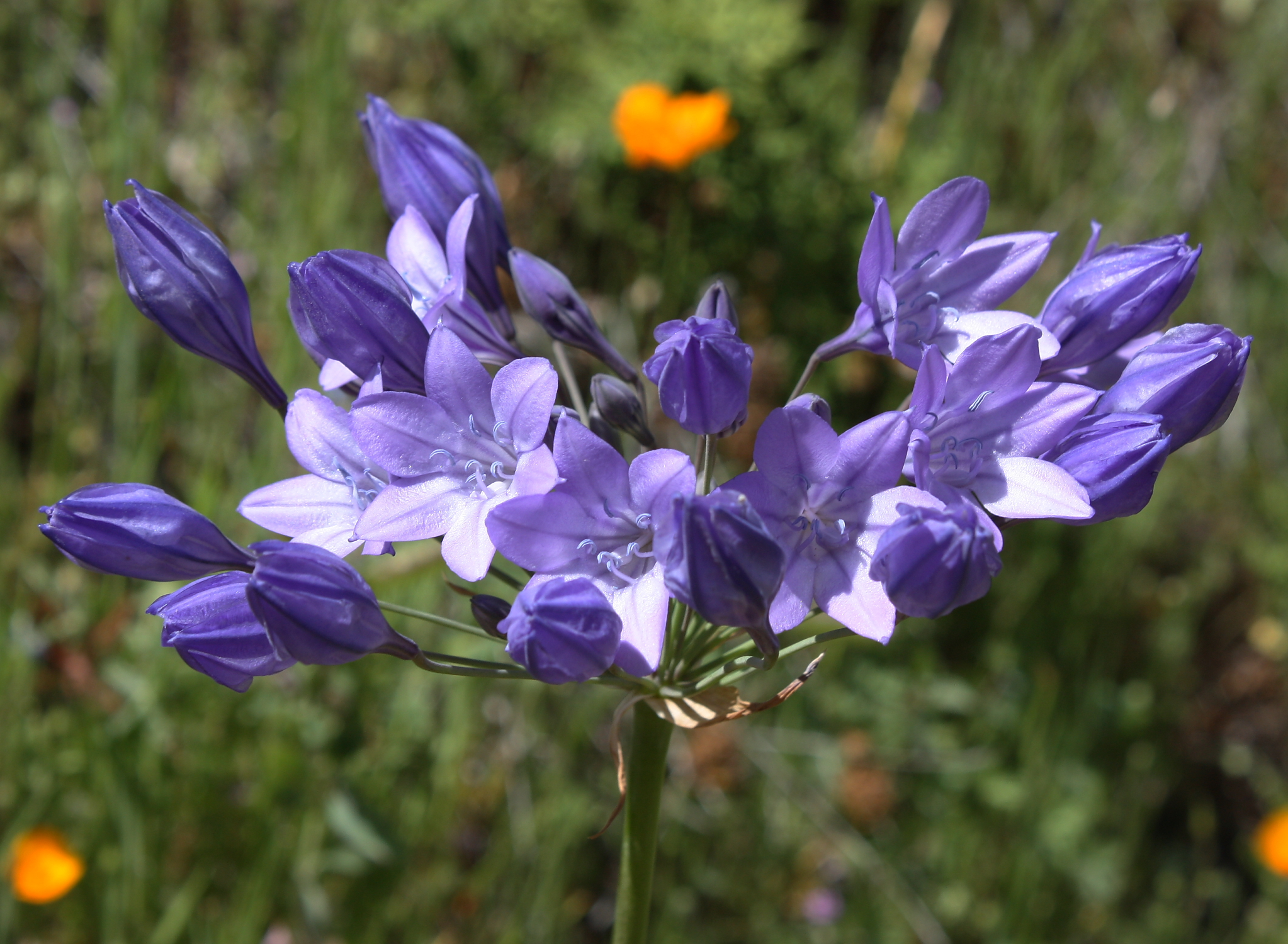

Scientific classification
- Kingdom: Plantae
- Clade: Tracheophytes
- Clade: Angiosperms
- Clade: Monocots
- Order: Asparagales
- Family: Asparagaceae
- Subfamily: Brodiaeoideae
- Genus: Triteleia
- Species: T. laxa

Binomial name
- Triteleia laxa Benth.

= Triteleia laxa =

Species of flowering plant

Triteleia laxa (previously Brodiaea laxa) is a triplet lily known by several common names, including Ithuriel's spear, common triteleia and grassnut. It is native to California where it is a common wildflower, and it is occasionally found in southwestern Oregon. It bears a tall, naked stem topped with a spray of smaller stalks, each ending in a purple or blue flower. The flower is tubular, opening into a sharply six-pointed star. The plant grows from a corm which is edible and similar in taste and use as the potato. The most used common name for the species, Ithuriel's spear, is a reference to the angel Ithuriel from Milton's Paradise Lost.

== Cultivation ==
Hardiness: USDA 6-10

== Etymology ==
The genus name Triteleia is derived from Greek and means 'triplicate', a reference to its flower parts, which are in multiples of three. The epithet laxa means 'open', 'uncrowded', 'distant', 'spreading', or 'lax'. It is derived from the Latin adjective laxus, meaning 'flaccid, loose'.
