= Laxa =

Laxa may refer to:

- Laxå, a locality in Sweden
- Laxå Municipality, a place in Sweden
- Laxá (Skagafjörður), a river in Iceland
- Laxá í Kjós, a river in Iceland
- Maricel Laxa (born 1970), a Filipino comedian and actress
- Vladimir Laxa (1870-1945), a Croatian general

Laxa, lax, loose or slack in Latin, may refer to:

- Cutis laxa, a group of rare connective tissue disorders in which the skin becomes inelastic and hangs loosely in folds
- Freesia laxa, a species of flowering plant

== See also ==
- Laksa
- Laxus
- Laxum
