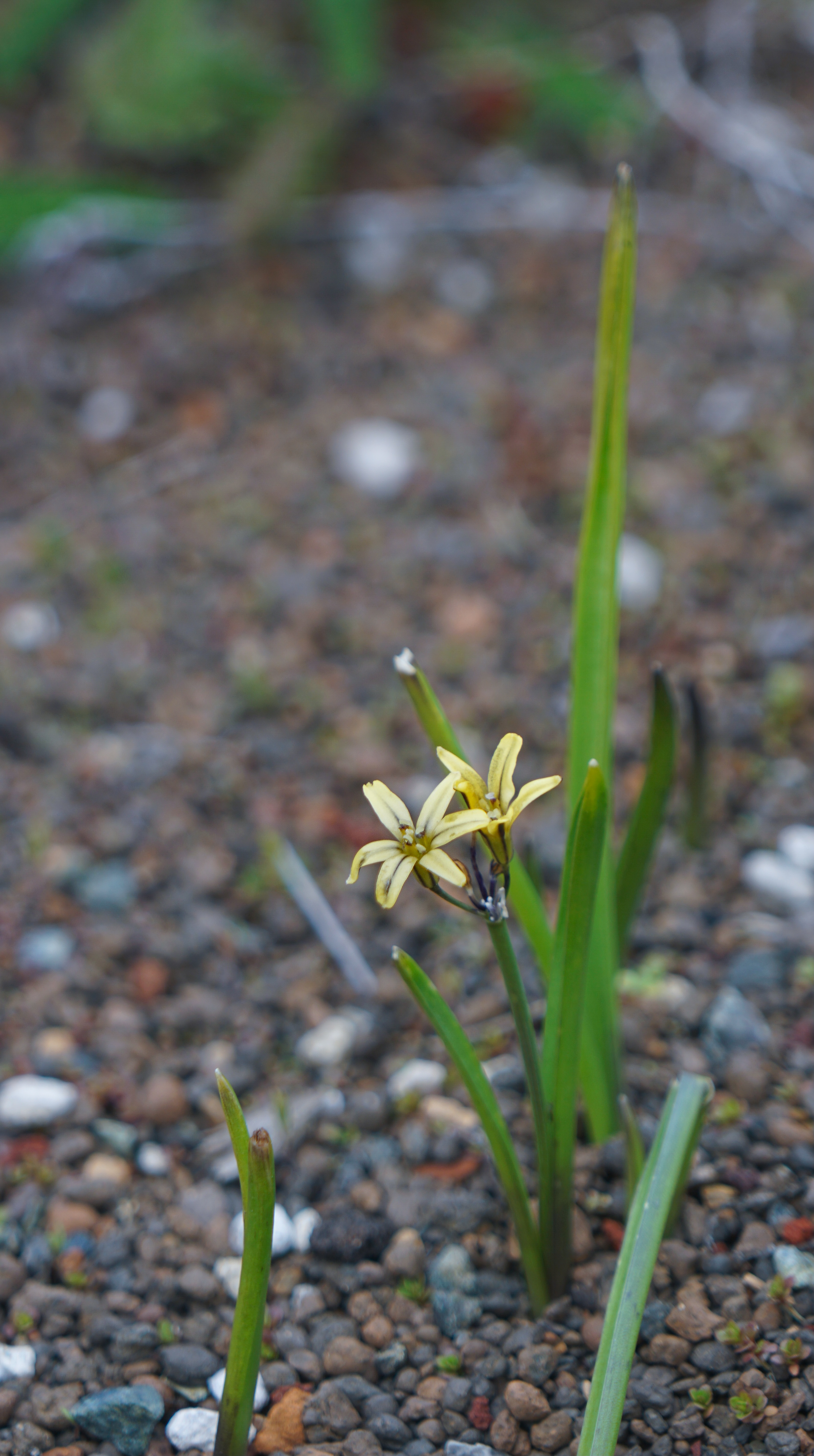

Conservation status
- Vulnerable (NatureServe)

Scientific classification
- Kingdom: Plantae
- Clade: Tracheophytes
- Clade: Angiosperms
- Clade: Monocots
- Order: Asparagales
- Family: Asparagaceae
- Subfamily: Brodiaeoideae
- Genus: Triteleia
- Species: T. dudleyi

Binomial name
- Triteleia dudleyi Hoover

Synonyms
- Brodiaea dudleyi

= Triteleia dudleyi =

Species of flowering plant

Triteleia dudleyi is a species of flowering plant known by the common name Dudley's triteleia. It is endemic to California, where it is known from sections of the High Sierra Nevada and the Transverse Ranges. It is a plant of subalpine climates, growing in mountain forests. It is a perennial herb growing from a corm. It produces two or three basal leaves up to 30 centimeters long by one wide. The inflorescence arises on an erect stem up to 30 or 35 centimeters tall and bears an umbel-like cluster of many flowers. Each flower is a funnel-shaped yellow bloom that dries purple. The flower has six lobes measuring up to 1.2 centimeters long. There are six stamens with lavender anthers.
