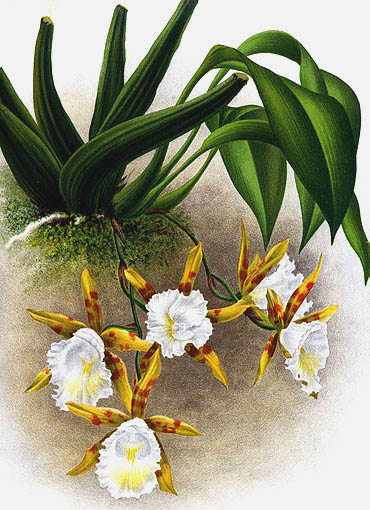
- Trichopilia brevis

Scientific classification
- Kingdom: Plantae
- Clade: Tracheophytes
- Clade: Angiosperms
- Clade: Monocots
- Order: Asparagales
- Family: Orchidaceae
- Subfamily: Epidendroideae
- Tribe: Cymbidieae
- Subtribe: Oncidiinae
- Genus: Trichopilia; Lindl.

Synonyms
- Pilumna Lindl.; Helcia Lindl; Leucohyle Klotzsch; Neoescobaria Garay

= Trichopilia =

Genus of orchids

Trichopilia, abbreviated Trpla. in the horticultural trade, is a genus of orchids. It consists of about 45 currently recognised species (as of June 2014), native to Mexico, Central America, the West Indies and South America.

== Species ==
1. Trichopilia aenigma
2. Trichopilia amabilis
3. Trichopilia archilarum
4. Trichopilia backhousiana
5. Trichopilia boliviensis
6. Trichopilia brasiliensis
7. Trichopilia brevis
8. Trichopilia callichroma
9. Trichopilia concepcionis
10. Trichopilia dalstroemii
11. Trichopilia endresiana
12. Trichopilia eneidae
13. Trichopilia fragrans
14. Trichopilia freulerae
15. Trichopilia galeottiana
16. Trichopilia gracilis
17. Trichopilia grata
18. Trichopilia hennisiana
19. Trichopilia juniniensis
20. Trichopilia laxa
21. Trichopilia leucoxantha
22. Trichopilia maculata
23. Trichopilia marginata
24. Trichopilia mesoperuviensis
25. Trichopilia mutica
26. Trichopilia occidentalis
27. Trichopilia oicophylax
28. Trichopilia olmosii
29. Trichopilia peruviana
30. Trichopilia primulina
31. Trichopilia punctata
32. Trichopilia punicea
33. Trichopilia × ramonensis
34. Trichopilia rostrata
35. Trichopilia sanguinolenta
36. Trichopilia santoslimae
37. Trichopilia similis
38. Trichopilia steinii
39. Trichopilia suavis
40. Trichopilia subulata
41. Trichopilia tortilis
42. Trichopilia tubella
43. Trichopilia turialbae
44. Trichopilia undulatissima
45. Trichopilia wageneri
