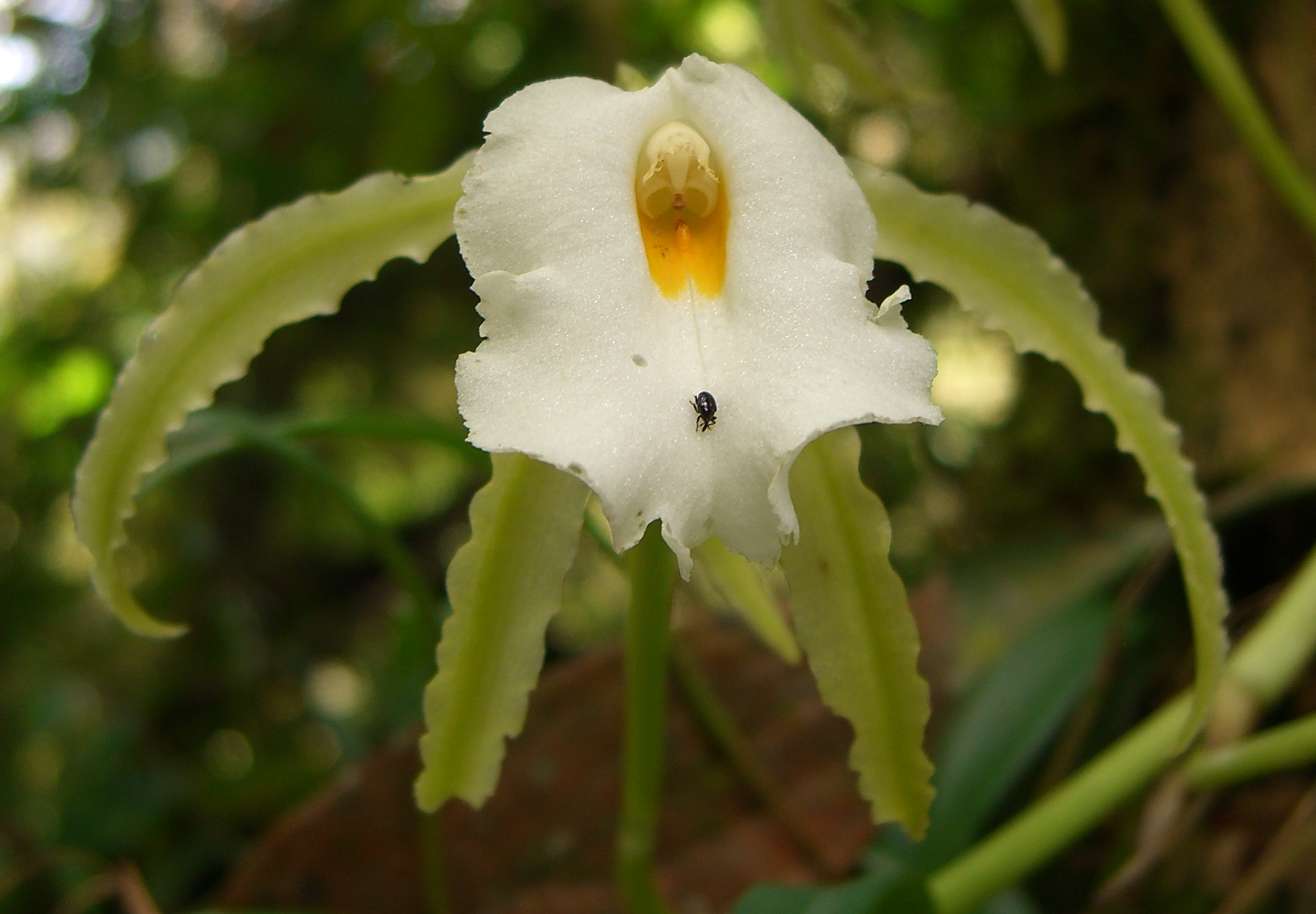
- Trichopilia fragrans flower

Scientific classification
- Kingdom: Plantae
- Clade: Tracheophytes
- Clade: Angiosperms
- Clade: Monocots
- Order: Asparagales
- Family: Orchidaceae
- Subfamily: Epidendroideae
- Genus: Trichopilia
- Species: T. fragrans

Binomial name
- Trichopilia fragrans (Lindl.) Rchb.f.

Synonyms
- Pilumna fragrans Lindl. (basionym); Trichopilia candida Linden ex Lindl.; Pilumna nobilis Rchb.f.; Trichopilia albida H.Wendl.; Trichopilia nobilis (Rchb.f.) Rchb.f.; Trichopilia fragrans var. nobilis (Rchb.f.) Linden & André; Trichopilia lehmannii Regel

= Trichopilia fragrans =

Species of orchid

Trichopilia fragrans is a species of orchid found from Caribbean to southern tropical America.
