= M. maritima =

M. maritima may refer to:

- Malcolmia maritima, the Virginia stock, a popular annual garden plant species
- Muilla maritima, the sea muilla and common muilla, a flowering plant species native to California

== Synonyms ==
- Matricaria maritima, a synonym for Tripleurospermum maritimum, a plant species

== See also ==
- Maritima (disambiguation)
