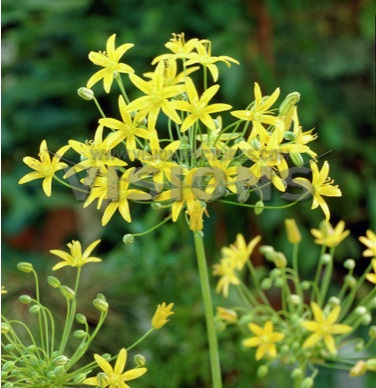

Scientific classification
- Kingdom: Plantae
- Clade: Tracheophytes
- Clade: Angiosperms
- Clade: Monocots
- Order: Asparagales
- Family: Asparagaceae
- Subfamily: Brodiaeoideae
- Genus: Bloomeria
- Species: B. crocea
- Variety: B. c. var. aurea

Trinomial name
- Bloomeria crocea var. aurea Kellogg

Synonyms
- Nothoscordum aureum (Kellogg) Hook.f.; Bloomeria aurea Kellogg

= Bloomeria crocea var. aurea =

Species of flowering plant

Bloomeria crocea var. aurea, with the common name golden stars, is a variety of Bloomeria that is endemic to California. When blooming in late spring, its bright colors are distinctive.

== Distribution ==
Bloomeria crocea var. aurea grows in dry flats and hillsides, and grassy slopes and ridges often in heavy soils and especially in foothill woods, up to 1500 meters in elevation. Golden stars grow in the coastal sage scrub, chaparral, valley grassland and oak woodland plant communities from Baja California in Mexico, to Santa Barbara and Kern Counties in central California.

== Description ==
Individuals of this variety have a solid corm, fibrous-coated, long narrow leaves, and a bracted cluster of many flowers (like exploding fireworks) at the top of tall flower stalk.

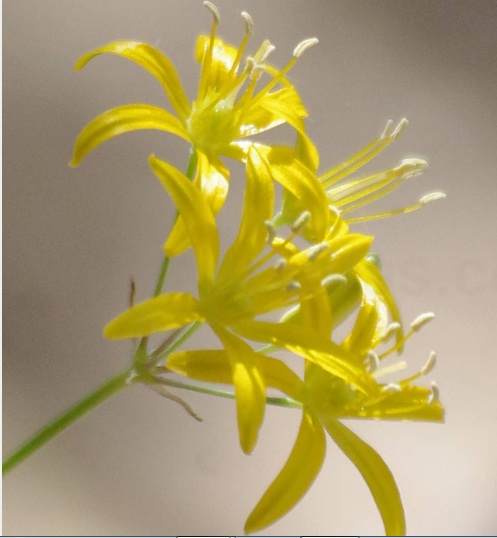
Bloomeria aurea

It blooms from April to June. Flowers of Bloomeria crocea var. aurea are about an inch across, with pedicles from one and a half to two inch long. The flowers are orange-yellow and the anthers are bright green. The flowers are yellow and have six equal divisions with six stamens and slender filaments (which if they are looked carefully under a microscope, a short, two-toothed, hairy appendage can be seen at their base). The style is club-shaped, with a three-lobed stigma.

Several angular, wrinkled seeds are in each cell of the roundish capsule. The plant which can grow from six to eighteen inches has long, narrow, grasslike leaf with large flower-cluster which can contain around fifty blossoms.

== Uses ==
=== Food ===
The only edible part of the plant is its corms. They can be eaten raw, although they do not taste as desirable.

=== Cultivation ===
Bloomeria crocea var. aurea is cultivated as an ornamental plant by specialty native plant nurseries. The plants require a warm position and well-drained rich sandy loam. During the growing season plants need moisture. When dormancy sets in and the foliage dies down, they should be kept dry until the autumn growth appears. These plants can rarely be seen in the colder areas, since the temperatures down between −5 and −10 °C can be tolerated.

Horticultural ranges for Bloomeria crocea var. aurea are:

- ph: 6.00 to 8.00
- usda: zones 6 to 10
- height: 0.20–0.50 metres (0.66–1.64 ft)
- width: 0.20 metres (0.66 ft)
- rainfall: 21–73 centimetres (8.3–28.7 in)
