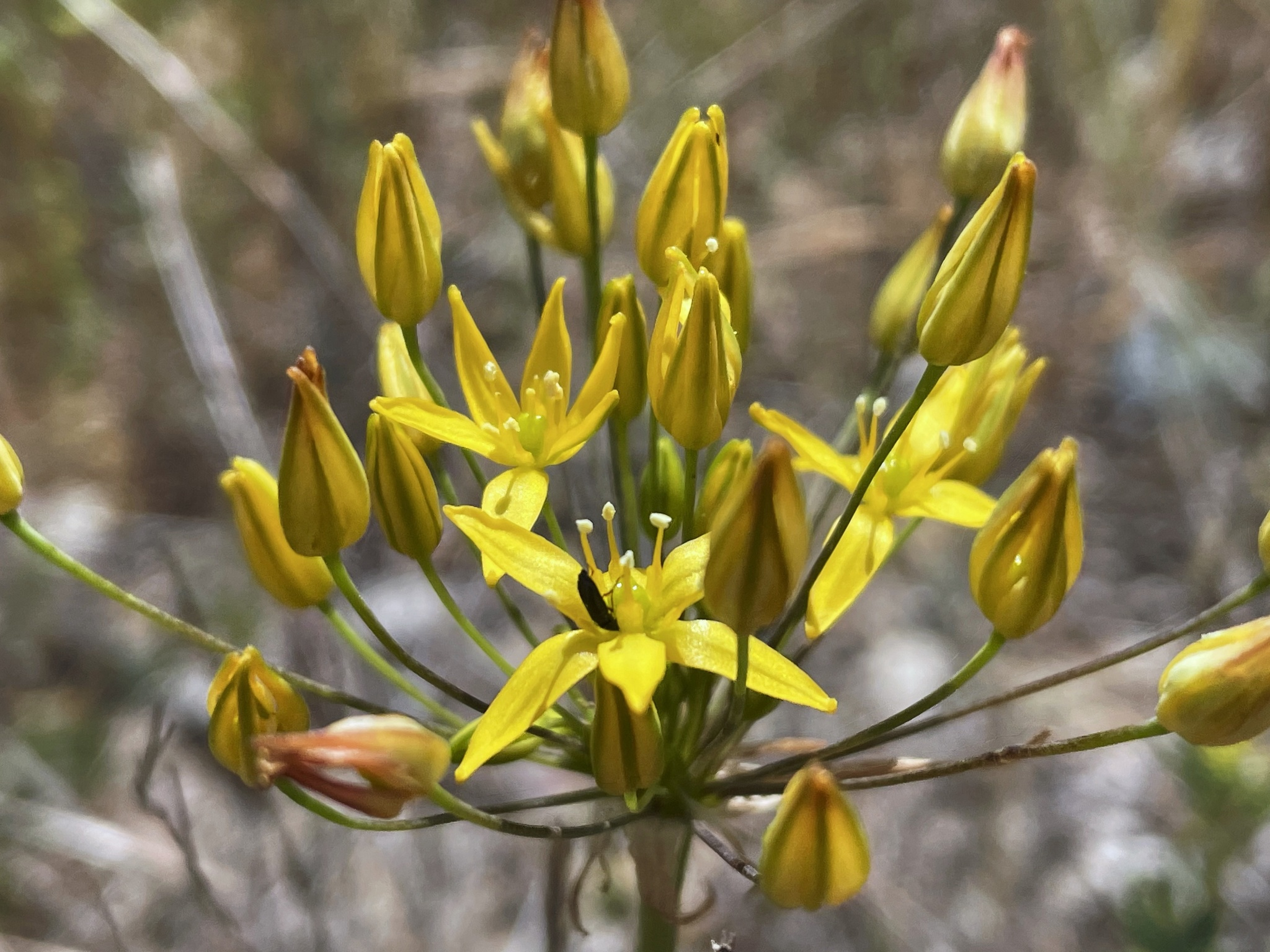

Conservation status
- Imperiled (NatureServe)

Scientific classification
- Kingdom: Plantae
- Clade: Tracheophytes
- Clade: Angiosperms
- Clade: Monocots
- Order: Asparagales
- Family: Asparagaceae
- Subfamily: Brodiaeoideae
- Genus: Bloomeria
- Species: B. clevelandii

Binomial name
- Bloomeria clevelandii (S.Watson) Hoover

Synonyms
- Muilla clevelandii (S.Watson) Hoover

= Bloomeria clevelandii =

San Diego goldenstar

Species of flowering plant

Bloomeria clevelandii is a rare species of flowering plant that is known by the common name San Diego goldenstar. It is native to a strip of scrub and coastal grassland in San Diego County, California, and adjacent Baja California. Genetic analysis of several morphologically similar genera shows that this species, which was named Muilla clevelandii for several decades, is not very closely related to the other members of Muilla and is moved back to Bloomeria.

Its specific epithet clevelandii honors 19th-century San Diego-based plant collector and lawyer Daniel Cleveland.

== Description ==
Bloomeria clevelandii is a perennial herb growing from a corm and producing 2 to 8 narrow leaves up to 15 centimeters long. The erect inflorescence arises from ground level and may be up to 70 centimeters tall. It is shaped like an umbel with up to 30 flowers borne on pedicels 2 or 3 centimeters long. The flower has six green-veined yellow tepals each up to a centimeter long.

The species is threatened by the destruction of its coastal habitat to urban development and by impacts from vehicles and trash dumping.
