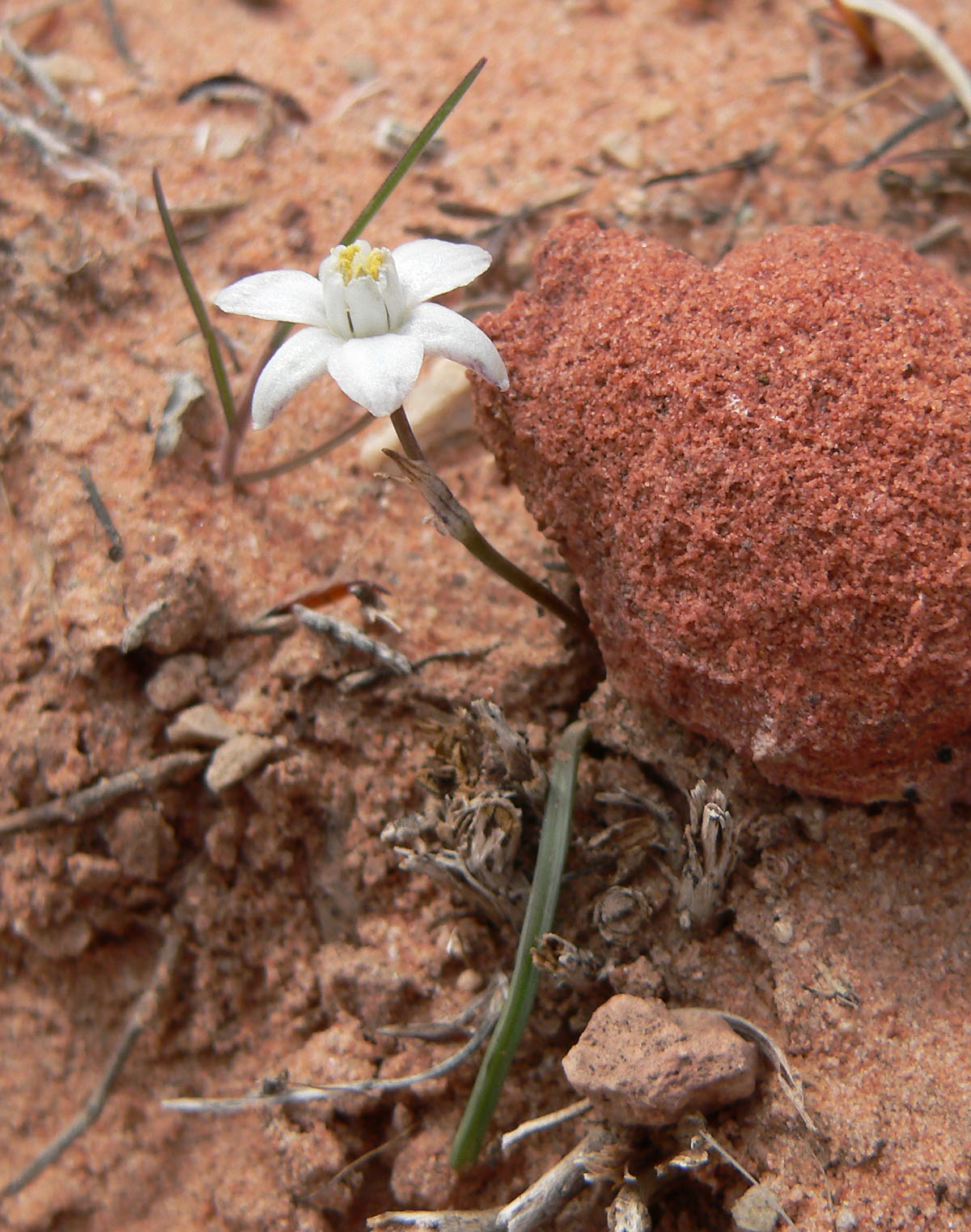

Conservation status
- Vulnerable (NatureServe)

Scientific classification
- Kingdom: Plantae
- Clade: Tracheophytes
- Clade: Angiosperms
- Clade: Monocots
- Order: Asparagales
- Family: Asparagaceae
- Subfamily: Brodiaeoideae
- Genus: Muilla
- Species: M. coronata

Binomial name
- Muilla coronata Greene

= Muilla coronata =

Species of flowering plant

Muilla coronata is a species of flowering plant known by the common name crowned muilla. It is native to the deserts of eastern California and southern Nevada, where it is found in scrub and Joshua Tree woodland habitat, as well as the slopes of nearby mountains. It is a perennial growing from a corm and reaching no more than 15 centimeters in height. The flowering stem bears an umbel-shaped array of up to 10, but usually fewer, flowers on pedicels up to 3 centimeters long. Each flower has six tepals which are white in color, often with a blue tinge inside and a greenish tinge on the outer surfaces. At the center of the flower are six stamens with wide white petal-like filaments. The filaments are partially fused into an erect, cylindrical "crown".
