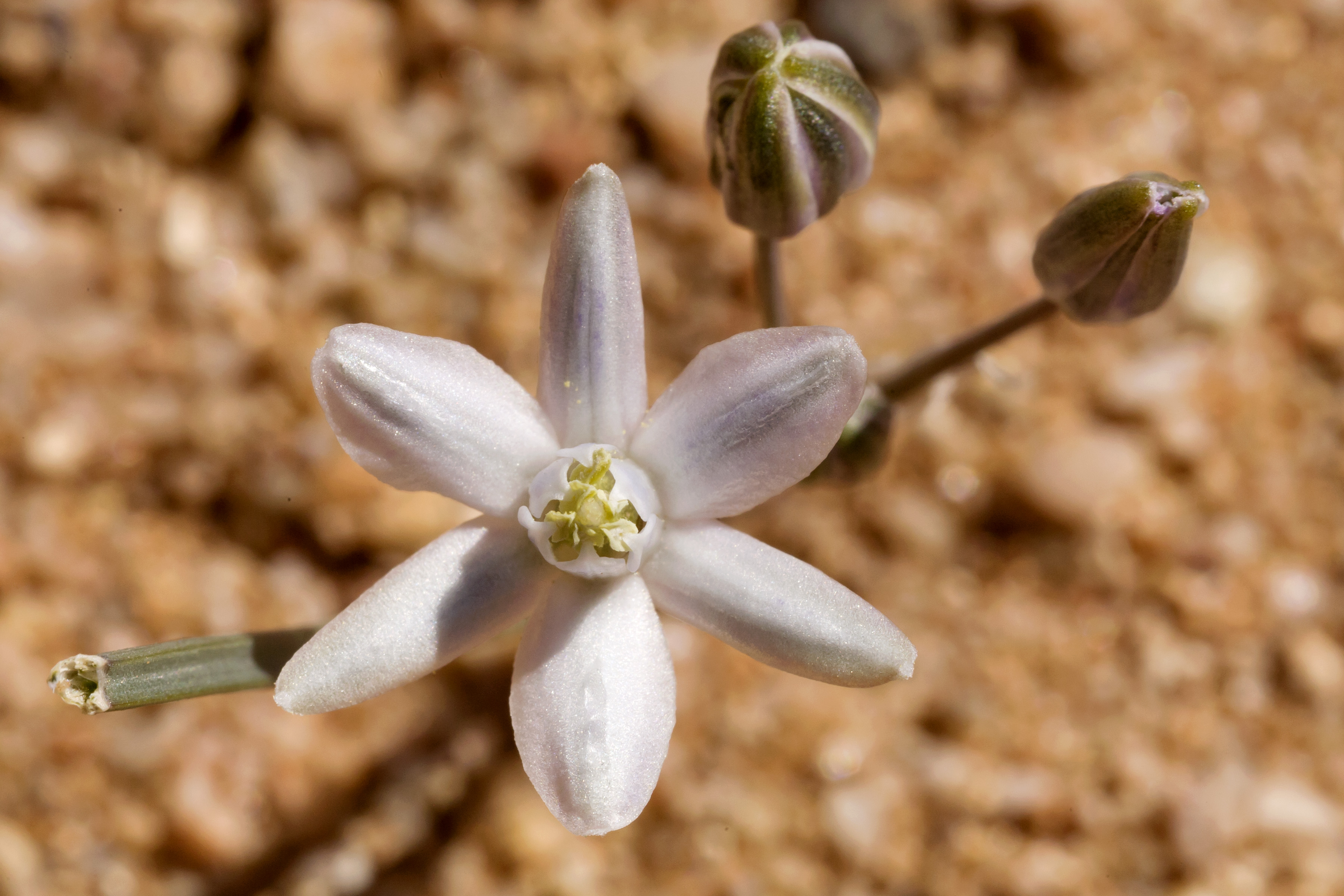

Scientific classification
- Kingdom: Plantae
- Clade: Tracheophytes
- Clade: Angiosperms
- Clade: Monocots
- Order: Asparagales
- Family: Asparagaceae
- Subfamily: Brodiaeoideae
- Genus: Muilla
- Species: M. lordsburgana

Binomial name
- Muilla lordsburgana P.J. Alexander

= Muilla lordsburgana =

Species of flowering plant

Muilla lordsburgana is a species of flowering plant known by the common name Lordsburg noino. It is native to the eastern fringe of the Chihuahuan Desert of southwestern New Mexico, where it is found in scrub habitats atop Lordsburg Mesa. It is a perennial growing from a corm and reaching no more than 9 centimeters in height. The flowering stem bears an umbel-shaped array of up to 6, but usually fewer, flowers on pedicels up to 2 centimeters long. Each flower has six tepals which are white to pale lavender in color with a prominent green midvein. At the center of the flower are six stamens with wide white to pale lavender petal-like filaments. The filaments are partially fused into an erect, cylindrical "crown".
