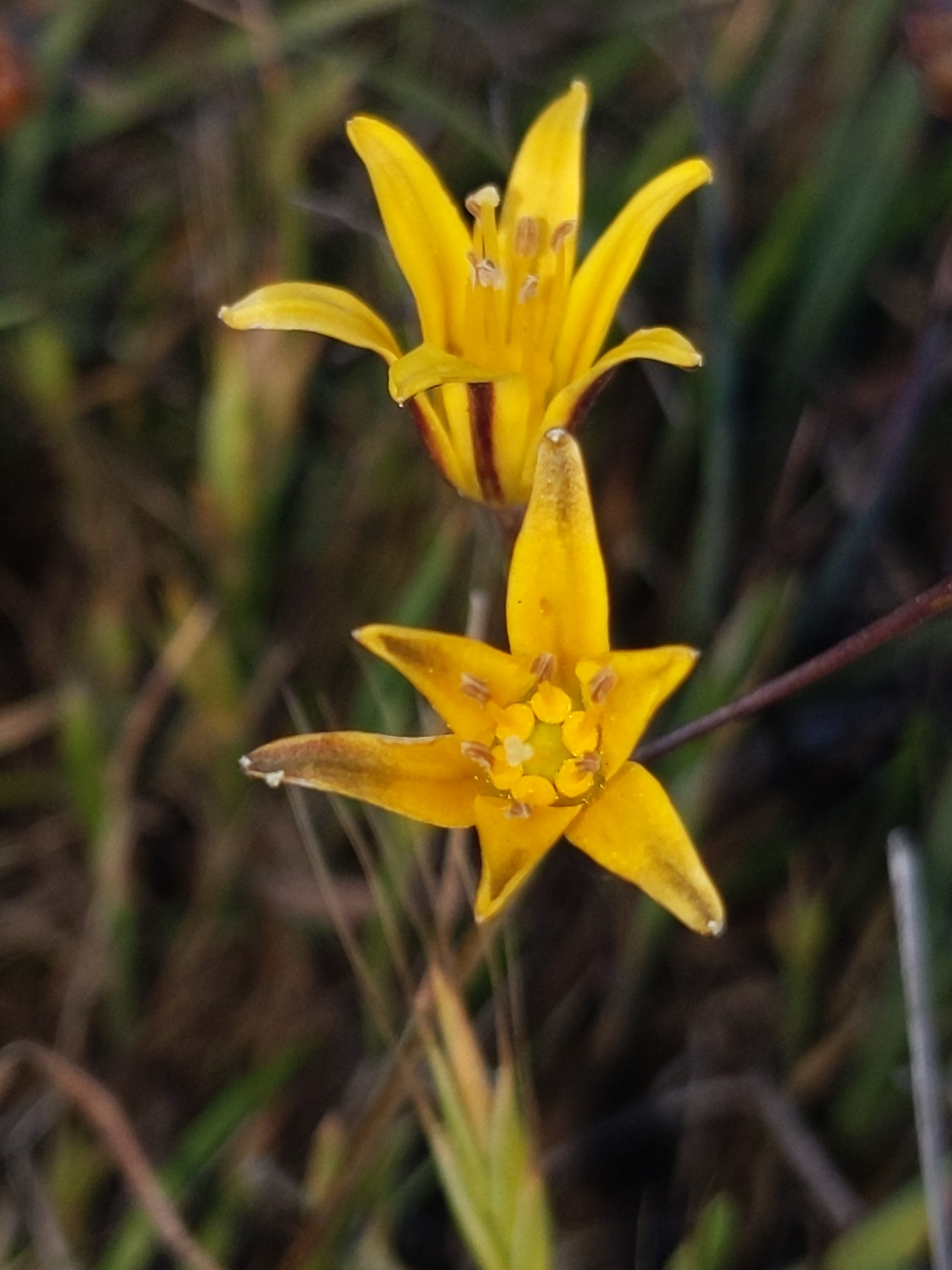

Conservation status
- Critically Imperiled (NatureServe)

Scientific classification
- Kingdom: Plantae
- Clade: Tracheophytes
- Clade: Angiosperms
- Clade: Monocots
- Order: Asparagales
- Family: Asparagaceae
- Subfamily: Brodiaeoideae
- Genus: Bloomeria
- Species: B. humilis

Binomial name
- Bloomeria humilis Hoover

= Bloomeria humilis =

Species of flowering plant

Bloomeria humilis is a rare species of flowering plant that is known by the common name dwarf goldenstar. It is endemic to San Luis Obispo County, California, where it is known from only one occurrence on the coastline near San Simeon.

== Description ==
It is a plant of the local chaparral and coastal grassland. It is a perennial herb growing from a corm and producing one or two narrow leaves up to 10 centimeters long. The inflorescence is up to 8 or 10 centimeters tall and bears several flowers, each on a pedicel. The flower has six brown-stippled yellow tepals each up to a centimeter long. The fruit is a capsule about half a centimeter in length.
