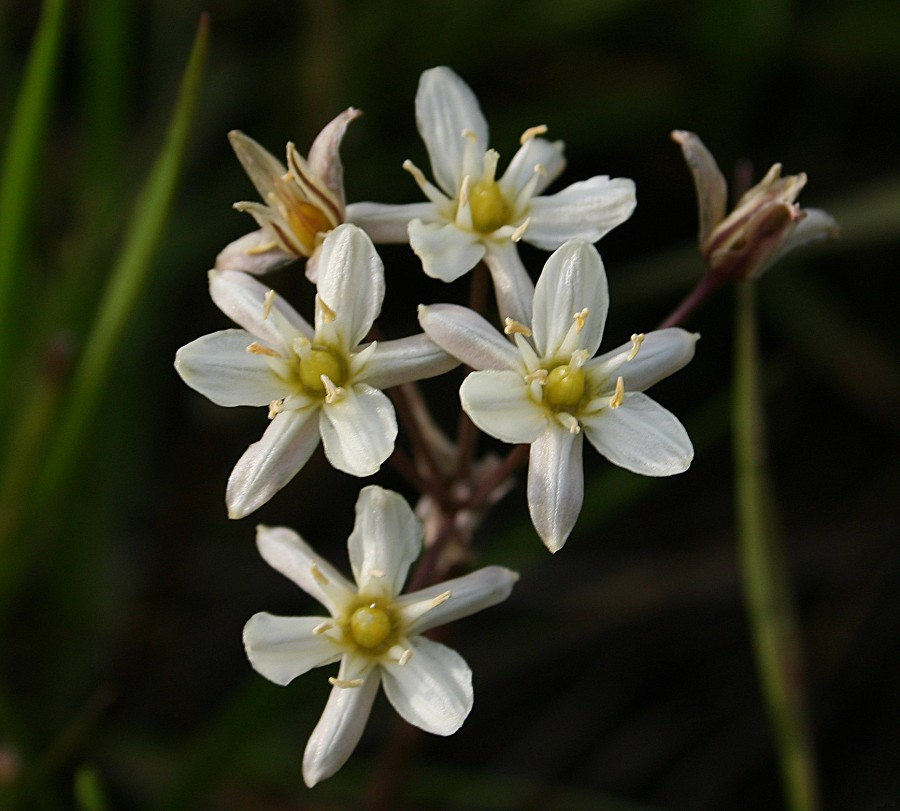
- Muilla maritima

Scientific classification
- Kingdom: Plantae
- Clade: Tracheophytes
- Clade: Angiosperms
- Clade: Monocots
- Order: Asparagales
- Family: Asparagaceae
- Subfamily: Brodiaeoideae
- Genus: Muilla; S.Watson ex Benth.

Type species
- Muilla maritima S.Watson ex Benth.

= Muilla =

Genus of flowering plants in the asparagus family

Muilla is a genus of monocots in the family Asparagaceae. It includes four to five species of flowering plants.

== Taxonomy ==
The genus name is a taxonomic anagram of Allium (in fact, the letters are in exact reverse order), the onion genus, for the flowers' resemblance.

In the APG III classification system, it is placed in the family Asparagaceae, subfamily Brodiaeoideae. The subfamily has also been treated as a separate family Themidaceae.

== Distribution ==
Muilla species are native to southwestern North America.

== Species ==
Current species

Image	Scientific name	Common name	Distribution
	Muilla coronata Greene	crowned muilla	Mojave Desert region in southeastern California and southern Nevada.
	Muilla lordsburgana P.J. Alexander	Lordsburg noino	eastern fringe of the Chihuahuan Desert around Lordsburg Mesa in New Mexico.
	Muilla maritima (Torr.) S.Watson ex Benth. in G.Bentham & J.D.Hooker	sea muilla	central and southern California; northern Baja California.
	Muilla transmontana Greene	Great Basin muilla	Mojave Desert and Great Basin regions in southeastern and northeastern California and western Nevada.

Formerly included species

- Muilla clevelandii (S.Watson) Hoover — synonym of Bloomeria clevelandii S.Watson
