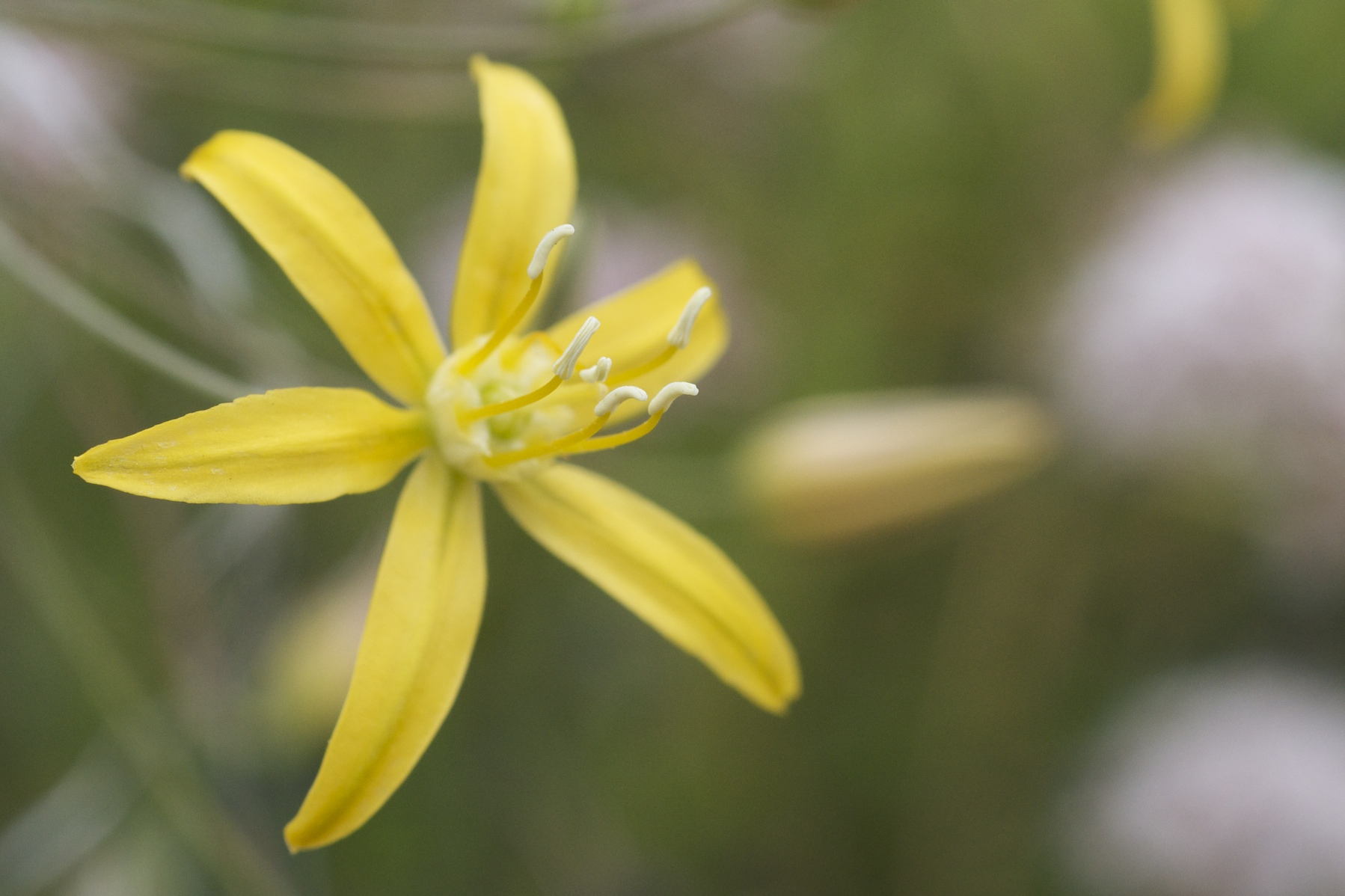
- Bloomeria crocea near Pomona, California

Scientific classification
- Kingdom: Plantae
- Clade: Tracheophytes
- Clade: Angiosperms
- Clade: Monocots
- Order: Asparagales
- Family: Asparagaceae
- Subfamily: Brodiaeoideae
- Genus: Bloomeria
- Species: B. crocea

Binomial name
- Bloomeria crocea (Torr.) Coville

= Bloomeria crocea =

Species of flowering plant

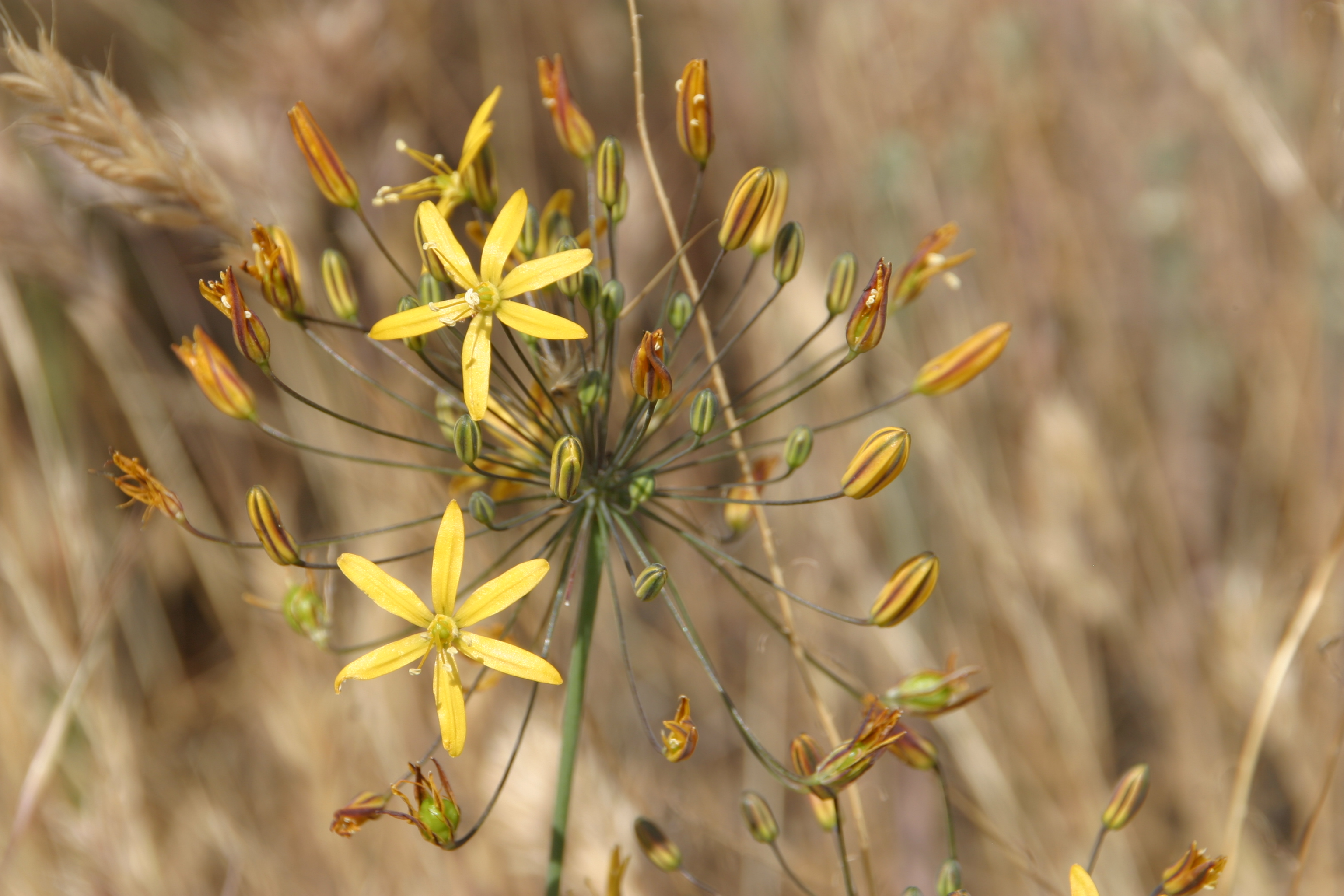
Bloomeria crocea, Santa Monica Mountains

Bloomeria crocea, also known as goldenstar, is a geophyte from southern California and northern Baja California. It is found along hillsides, in grassland and chaparral edges, and in dry flats.

== Description ==
The corms of Bloomeria crocea have a fibrous exterior and usually produces only one leaf. Plants produce six-petaled golden flowers that are clustered in a loose umbel. When the three-lobed stigma is fertilized, Bloomeria produces capsules that contain small black seeds. The seeds then require three to four years to become a mature plant.

== Distribution ==
Growing in full sun, Bloomeria crocea prefers porous soil and semi-dry conditions, in the Peninsular, Transverse, and southern California Coast Ranges, and on the Channel Islands. Its distribution is found along the southern coast from Santa Barbara County and western Kern County, through Southern California, down into Baja California.

== Varieties ==
Three varieties are currently recognised:

- B. crocea var. aurea
- B. crocea var. crocea
- B. crocea var. montana
