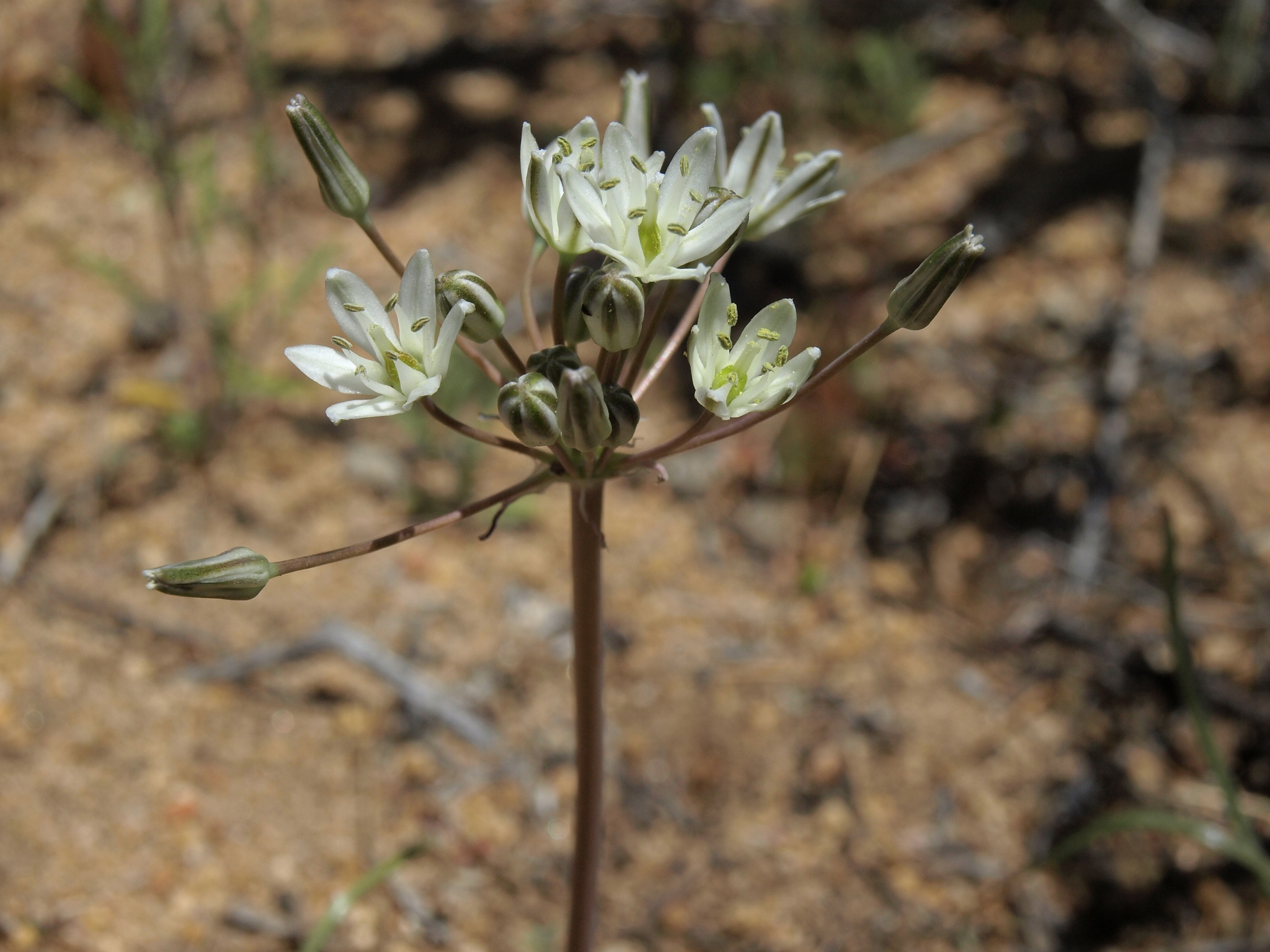

Scientific classification
- Kingdom: Plantae
- Clade: Tracheophytes
- Clade: Angiosperms
- Clade: Monocots
- Order: Asparagales
- Family: Asparagaceae
- Subfamily: Brodiaeoideae
- Genus: Muilla
- Species: M. transmontana

Binomial name
- Muilla transmontana Greene

= Muilla transmontana =

Species of flowering plant

Muilla transmontana is a species of flowering plant known by the common name Inland muilla. It is native to sections of the Great Basin in Nevada and in California east of the major mountain ranges. It grows in mountain forest and scrubby high desert and plateau habitat.

It is a perennial plant growing from a corm and producing an erect flowering stem up to half a meter tall. The onionlike leaves at the base of the stem are 20 to 60 centimeters long. The flowering stem bears an umbel-shaped array of 12 to 30 flowers on pedicels up to 3 centimeters long. Each flower has six tepals which are white, turning pale purple as they dry, and just under a centimeter in length. At the center of the flower are six erect stamens with filaments expanded at the base and fused into a low cup around the gynoecium.
