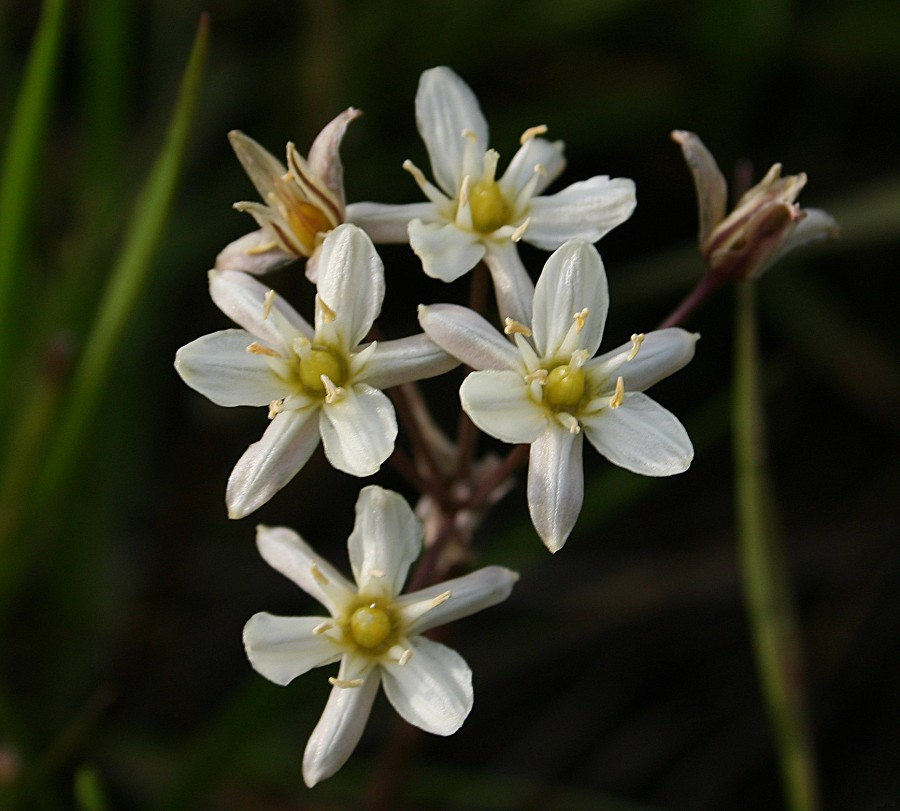

Scientific classification
- Kingdom: Plantae
- Clade: Tracheophytes
- Clade: Angiosperms
- Clade: Monocots
- Order: Asparagales
- Family: Asparagaceae
- Subfamily: Brodiaeoideae
- Genus: Muilla
- Species: M. maritima

Binomial name
- Muilla maritima (Torr.) S.Watson

Synonyms
- Allium maritimum (Torr.) Benth. 1857, illegitimate homonym, not Raf. 1810; Hesperoscordum maritimum Torr.; Milla maritima (Torr.) S.Watson; Bloomeria maritima (Torr.) J.F.Macbr.; Muilla tenuis Congdon; Bloomeria maritima var. serotina (Greene) J.F.Macbr.; Muilla serotina Greene

= Muilla maritima =

Species of flowering plant

Muilla maritima is a species of flowering plant known by the common names sea muilla and common muilla. It is native to California and Baja California, where it grows in many types of habitats from the coast to the Mojave Desert and Sierra Nevada foothills and other inland mountains, in grassland, woodland, desert, and forest floras. It is a perennial plant growing from a corm and producing an erect flowering stem up to half a meter tall. The onion-like leaves at the base of the stem may be 60 centimeters long. The flowering stem bears an umbel-shaped array of many flowers on pedicels up to 5 centimeters long. Each flower has six tepals which are green-tinged white in color with brownish midribs and no more than 6 millimeters in length. At the center of the flower are six erect stamens with blue, green, or purplish anthers.
