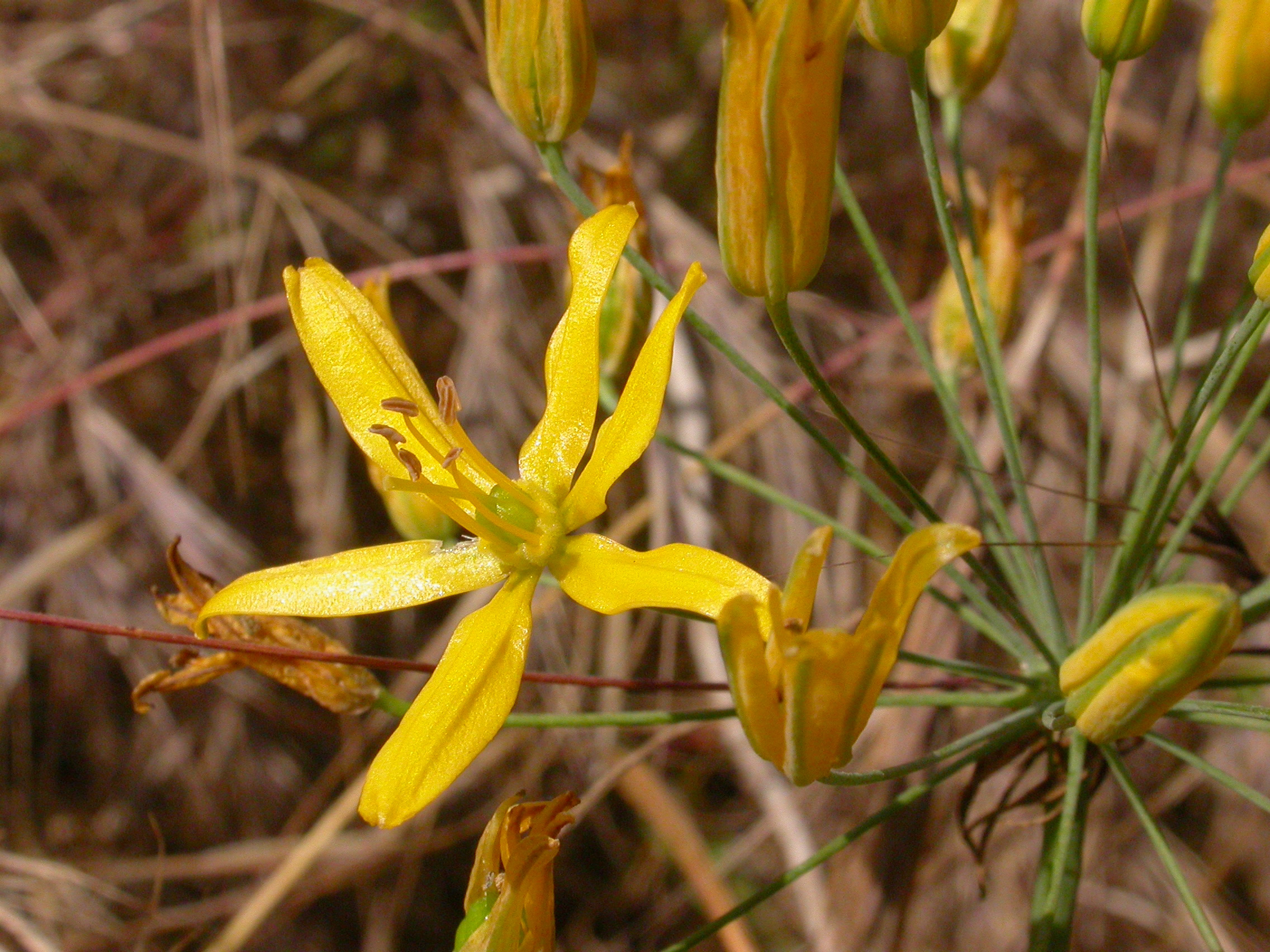
- Bloomeria crocea near Pomona, California

Scientific classification
- Kingdom: Plantae
- Clade: Tracheophytes
- Clade: Angiosperms
- Clade: Monocots
- Order: Asparagales
- Family: Asparagaceae
- Subfamily: Brodiaeoideae
- Genus: Bloomeria; Kellogg

= Bloomeria =

Genus of flowering plants

Bloomeria is a genus of flowering plants with a geophyte lifestyle in the family Asparagaceae, subfamily Brodiaeoideae. It was named for Hiram Green Bloomer (1819–1874), an early San Francisco botanist.

== Species ==
It consists of three species native to California and Baja California:

Image	Scientific name	Distribution
	Bloomeria clevelandii S. Watson	San Diego County and northern Baja California
	Bloomeria crocea (Torrey) Coville	Baja California, California
	Bloomeria humilis Hoover	central coast of California (Monterey and San Luis Obispo Counties)
